= Maitrī =

Buddhist term meaning "loving-kindness"

Translations of Mettā
- English: Loving-kindness, benevolence
- Sanskrit: मैत्री (IAST: maitrī)
- Pali: mettā
- Chinese: 慈 (Pinyin: cí)
- Indonesian: cinta kasih
- Japanese: 慈 (Rōmaji: ji)
- Khmer: មេត្តា (UNGEGN: métta)
- Korean: 자 (RR: ja)
- Mon: မေတ္တာ
- Mongolian: ᠠᠰᠠᠷᠠᠯ᠂ ᠵᠢᠮᠪᠠ асрал, жамбаа SASM/GNC: asaral, jimba
- Sinhala: මෛත්‍රිය
- Tagalog: Maitli
- Tibetan: བྱམས་པ (jampa)
- Thai: เมตตา (RTGS: metta)
- Vietnamese: từ (Chữ Nôm: 慈)

Maitrī (Pali: mettā) is a Sanskrit term that refers to benevolence, loving-kindness, friendliness, amity, good will, and active interest in others. The term appears in various ancient and medieval Indian texts, such as the Upanishads, Jain Sutras and Buddhist Suttas. Within Buddhism, it is notably the first of the four sublime states (Brahmaviharas), one of the ten pāramīs of Theravāda Buddhism, and expounded upon in the Metta Sutta.

The cultivation of benevolence (mettā bhāvanā) is a popular form of Buddhist meditation. It is a part of the four immeasurables in Brahmavihara (divine abidings) meditation. Metta as "compassion meditation" is often practiced in Asia by broadcast chanting, wherein monks chant for the laity.

The meditative cultivation of mettā has been studied by scientists. Small sample studies suggest that loving-kindness meditation may result in enhanced positive emotions during daily life in individuals who continue the practice. However, peer reviews question the quality and sample size of these studies.

== Etymology and meaning ==
The Sanskrit term maitrī is derived from the term mitra which means "friend". The Pali term mettā is derived from the Sanskrit term. The Sanskrit term is found in this sense in the Vedic literature, such as the Shatapatha Brahmana and various early Upanishads, and Vedanga literature such as Pāṇini's Aṣṭādhyāyī 5.4.36. The term appears in Buddhist texts as an important concept and practice.

Buswell and Lopez, as well as Harvey, translate mettā as "loving-kindness". In Buddhist belief, this is a Brahmavihara (divine abode) or an immeasurable that leads to a meditative state by being a counter to ill-will. It removes clinging to negative states of mind, by cultivating kindness unto all beings.

== Origins ==
According to Martin Wiltshire, prior to the advent of the Buddha, there existed traditions of Brahmaloka and of meditation with the four virtues of loving-kindness, compassion, empathetic joy, and equanimity. The early Buddhist texts assert that pre-Buddha ancient Indian sages who taught these virtues were earlier incarnations of the Buddha. Post-Buddha, these same virtues are found in the Hindu texts such as verse 1.33 of the Yoga Sutras of Patañjali, wherein the word maitri is synonymous with metta.

Loving-kindness (maitri), along with compassion and equanimity, are found in the early Upanishads of Hinduism, while loving-kindness (metta) is found in early Sutras of Jainism along with compassion, empathetic joy and equanimity. The ancient Indian Paccekabuddhas who are mentioned in the early Buddhist Suttas, those who lived before the Buddha, mention all "four immeasurables" and Brahmavihara, and they are claimed in the Suttas to be previous incarnations of the Buddha.

According to Ian Harris, the Buddhist scriptures acknowledge that the metta-concept containing four Brahmavihara meditation practices "did not originate within the Buddhist tradition". The Buddha never claimed that the "four immeasurables" and related metta-meditation were his unique ideas, states Harvey Aronson, in a manner similar to "cessation, quieting, nirvana".

The pre-Buddha Chandogya Upanishad, states Jayatilleke, in section 8.15 teaches mettā and ahimsa (doctrine of non-harm, esp. non-violence) to all creatures claiming that this practice leads to Brahmaloka. The shift in Vedic ideas, from rituals to virtues, is particularly discernible in the early Upanishadic thought, and it is unclear as to what extent and how early Upanishadic traditions of Hinduism and Sramanic traditions such as Buddhism and Jainism influenced each other, on ideas such as "four immeasurables", meditation, and Brahmavihara.

In the Jain text, the Tattvartha Sutra (Chapter 7, sutra 11), which is accepted by all Jain sub-traditions as authoritative, there is a mention of four right sentiments: Maitri, pramoda, karunya, and madhyastha:

Benevolence towards all living beings, joy at the sight of the virtuous, compassion and sympathy for the afflicted, and tolerance towards the insolent and ill-behaved.

== Mettā in Buddhism ==
=== Mettā meditation ===
Mettā meditation, or often "loving-kindness meditation", is the practice concerned with the cultivation of mettā, i.e. benevolence, kindness, and amity. The practice generally consists of silent repetitions of phrases such as "may you be happy" or "may you be free from suffering", for example directed at a person who, depending on tradition, may or may not be internally visualized.

Two different methodological approaches have been discerned in recent review papers: practices that focus on compassion, and practices focusing on loving-kindness. Focusing on compassion means that meditation consists of the wish to relieve a being from suffering, whereas focusing on loving-kindness means wishing a being happiness.

The practice gradually increases in difficulty with respect to the targets that receive the practitioner's compassion or loving-kindness. At first the practitioner is targeting "oneself, then loved ones, neutral ones, difficult ones, and finally all beings, with variations across traditions".

According to Ven. Sangye Khadro's book Awakening a Kind Heart, loving kindness or mettā is the sincere wish that all beings have happiness and its causes. This can be displayed mainly through 3 forms:

1. Care for the other individual
2. Appreciation of what the individual has done for us
3. The sincere wish for the individual to have happiness

The "far enemy" of mettā is hate or ill-will, a mind-state in obvious opposition. The "near enemy" (quality which superficially resembles mettā but is in fact more subtly in opposition to it), is attachment (greed): here too one likes experiencing a virtue, but for the wrong reason.

=== Mettā in specific Buddhist texts ===
In the Pāli Canon, the term mettā appears in many texts such as the Kakacupama Sutta and Karaniya Metta Sutta. Other canonical materials, such as in the Paṭisambhidāmagga, elaborate on it as a practice. Yet other canonical sources, such as the Abhidhamma, underline the key role of benevolence in the development of wholesome karma for better rebirths.

This basic statement of intention and verse can also be found in several other canonical discourses.

==== Karaniya Metta Sutta (Sn 1.8) ====
May all beings be happy and secure, may they be happy-minded.
Whatever living beings there are—feeble or strong, long, stout or medium,
short, small or large, seen or unseen (ghosts, gods and hell-beings),
those dwelling far or near, those who are born or those who await rebirth
may all beings, without exception be happy-minded.
Let none deceive another nor despise any person whatever in any place;
in anger or ill-will let them not wish any suffering to each other.
Just as a mother would protect her only child at the risk of her own life,
even so, let him cultivate a boundless heart towards all beings.
Let her thoughts of boundless lovingkindness pervade the whole world:
above, below and across, without obstruction, without any hatred, without any enmity.
⋮
This they say is divine abiding here.
She will surely not come again to any womb (rebirth in the sense-desire realm).

— Metta Sutta, Khp 8-9, Translated by Peter Harvey

Metta or lovingkindness here, states Harvey, is a heartfelt aspiration for the happiness of all beings. It is different from "lack of ill-will", and more an antidote to fear and hatred. It is the precept to conquer anger by kindness, conquer the liar by truth, conquer the stingy by giving, and conquer evil by good, says Harvey.

==== Vatthūpama Sutta ====
In over a dozen discourses, the following description (in English and Pāli) is provided for radiating loving-kindness in six directions:

One abides, having suffused with a mind of benevolence one direction of the world, likewise the second, likewise the third, likewise the fourth, and so above, below, around and everywhere, and to all as to himself; one abides suffusing the entire universe with benevolence, with a mind grown great, lofty, boundless and free from enmity and ill will.	So mettāsahagatena cetasā ekaṃ disaṃ pharitvā viharati. Tathā dutiyaṃ. Tathā tatiyaṃ. Tathā catutthiṃ. Iti uddhamadho tiriyaṃ sabbadhi sabbattatāya sabbāvantaṃ lokaṃ mettāsahagatena cetasā vipulena mahaggatena appamāṇena averena abyāpajjena pharitvā viharati.
— Vatthūpama Sutta, MN 7 tr. Nyanaponika Thera

In the canon, this basic formula is expanded upon in a variety of ways. For instance, a couple of discourses provide the following description of how to gain rebirth in the heavenly realm of Brahmā (brahmānaṃ sahavyatāya maggo) :

"What... is the path to the company of Brahmā? Here a bhikkhu abides pervading one quarter with a mind imbued with benevolence, likewise the second, likewise the third, likewise the fourth; so above, below, around, and everywhere, and to all as to himself, he abides pervading the all-encompassing world with a mind imbued with benevolence, abundant, exalted, immeasurable, without hostility, and without ill will. When the deliverance of mind by benevolence is developed in this way, no limiting action remains there, none persists there.

"Just as a vigorous trumpeter could make himself (or herself) heard without difficulty in the four quarters, so too, when the deliverance of mind by benevolence is developed in this way, no limiting action remains there, none persists there. This is the path to the company of Brahmā."

==== Patisambhidamagga Mettakatha (Ps. 2.4) ====
May all beings be free from
enmity, affliction and anxiety,
and live contentedly.

— Mettākathā (Ps. 2.4)

In the Khuddaka Nikāya's Paṭisambhidāmagga, traditionally ascribed to Sariputta, is a section entitled Mettākathā (Ps. 2.4, "Story on Loving-Kindness"). In this instruction, a general formula (below, in English and Pāli), essentially identical to the aforementioned Cunda Kammaraputta Sutta verse (especially evident in the Pāli), is provided for radiating benevolence:

In addition, this instruction categorizes twenty-two ways in which "the mind-deliverance of benevolence" (mettācetovimutti) can be radiated with

five ways of "unspecified pervasion" (anodhiso pharaṇā)
all beings (sabbe sattā), all breathing things (sabbe pāṇā bhāvapariyāpannā), all creatures (sabbe bhūtā bhāvapariyāpannā), all persons (sabbe puggalā bhāvapariyāpannā), all with a personality (sabbe attabhāvapariyāpannā)
seven ways of "specified pervasion" (anodhiso pharaṇā)
all women (sabbā itthiyo), all men (sabbe purisā), all Noble Ones (sabbe ariyā), all non-Noble Ones (sabbe anariyā), all deities (sabbe devā), all humans (sabbe manussā), all born in lower realms (sabbe vinipātikā),
ten ways of "directional pervasion" (disā-pharaṇā)
of the eastern direction (puratthimāya disāya), of the western direction (pacchimāya disāya), of the northern direction (uttarā disāya), of the southern direction (dakkhīṇāya disāya), of the eastern intermediate direction (puratthimāya anudisāya), of the western intermediate direction (pacchimāya anudisāya), of the northern intermediate direction (uttarā anudisāya), of the southern intermediate direction (dakkhīṇāya anudisāya), of the downward direction (heṭṭhimāya disāya), of the upward direction (uparimāya disāya).

Moreover, the directional pervasions can then be applied to each of the unspecific and specific pervasions. For instance, after radiating benevolence to all beings in the east (Sabbe puratthimāya disāya sattā...), one radiates it to all beings in the west and then north and then south, etc.; then, one radiates it to all breathing things in this fashion (Sabbe puratthimāya disāya pāṇā...), then all creatures, persons, and so forth until such is extended for all those born in the lower realms.

=== Benefits of mettā ===
The Pali canon says that there are a number of benefits from the practicing of mettā meditation, including:

One sleeps easily, wakes easily, dreams no evil dreams. One is dear to human beings, dear to non-human beings. The devas protect one. Neither fire, poison, nor weapons can touch one. One's mind gains concentration quickly. One's complexion is bright. One dies unconfused and—if penetrating no higher—is headed for [rebirth in] the Brahma worlds.

The canon also upholds fully ripened mettā development as a foremost antidote to ill will:

"No other thing do I know, O monks, on account of which unarisen ill will does not arise and arisen ill will is abandoned so much as on account of this: the liberation of the heart by benevolence. For one who attends properly to the liberation of the heart by benevolence, unarisen ill will does not arise and arisen ill will is abandoned."

"Monks, whatever grounds there are for making merit productive of a future birth, all these do not equal a sixteenth part of the liberation of mind by benevolence. The liberation of mind by benevolence surpasses them and shines forth, bright and brilliant."

Mettā meditation is regularly recommended to the Buddha's followers in the Pali canon, which generally advises radiating mettā in each of the six directions. A different set of practical instructions, still widely used today, is found in the 5th century CE Visuddhimagga; this is also the main source for the "near and far enemies" given above. In addition, variations on this traditional practice have been popularized by modern teachers and applied in modern research settings.

== Maitrī and mettā ==
Mettā is found in pre-Buddhist Vedic Sanskrit texts as Maitrī, Maitra, and Mitra, which are derived from the ancient root Mid (love). These Vedic words appear in the Samhita, Aranyaka, Brahmana, and Upanishad layers of texts in the Rigveda, Samaveda, Yajurveda, and Atharvaveda.

Speaking the truth I desire this:
May I enjoy her lovingkindness as do ye,
May not one of you supplant another,
She hath enjoyed my lovingkindness, the all-knower.

— Taittiriya Samhita 4.3.12, Yajurveda, Translated by Arthur Keith

Similarly, the term appears in hymn 55 of Book 19 of the Atharvaveda, and various Upanishads. A major early Upanishad of Hinduism, named Maitri Upanishad, discusses universal kindness and amity. The Maitri Upanishad, states Martin Wiltshire, provides the philosophical underpinning, by asserting, "what one thinks, that one becomes, this is the eternal mystery". This idea, adds Wiltshire, reflects the assumption in the ancient thought that one influences one's own environment and situation, causality is equitable, and "good volitional acts conduce pleasant situations, while bad volitional acts conduce unpleasant situations". The Maitri Upanishad teaches, states Juan Mascaró, that peace begins in one's own mind, in one's longing for truth, in looking within, and that "a quietness of mind overcomes good and evil works, and in quietness the soul is one: then one feels the joy of eternity."

The Isha Upanishad similarly discusses universal amity and loving-kindness, but without the term mettā. These teachings of universal maitri influenced Mahatma Gandhi.

In Jainism, Yogabindu – the 6th-century yoga text by Haribhadra – uses the Sanskrit word maitri in verses 402–404, in the sense of loving-kindness towards all living beings.

== Mettā meditation research ==
Some pilot research studies on the effect of mettā meditation indicate an increase in positive emotions for practitioners. In particular, an immediate impact on positive emotions after practice as well as a long-term effect could be shown, though these effects might not hold true for everybody. In one proof-of-concept study, uncontrolled in sample selection and benchmarking, the researchers report therapeutic potential for psychological problems like depression or social anxiety, when combined with other reliable treatments.

=== Therapeutic potential ===
The application of mettā meditation for the treatment of psychological and other healthcare-related problems is a topic of research. Hofmann et al. discuss the potential use for therapy and report insufficient data, with some promising studies so far. Those studies could show a positive impact on problems such as schizophrenia, depression, and anxiety. According to Hofmann et al., there needs to be more rigorous research, especially with the application of Buddhist approaches to loving-kindness and compassion meditation.

In an eight-week pilot study in 2005, loving-kindness meditation led to reduced pain and anger in people with chronic lower back pain. Compassion meditation, a Science Daily article states, may reduce inflammatory and behavioral responses to stress that have been linked to depression and a number of medical illnesses.

Mettā meditation is a central practice within mindfulness-based pain management (MBPM), the effectiveness of which has been supported by a range of studies.

=== Meta-analysis ===
A 2015 meta-analysis, synthesizing various high-quality experiments on loving-kindness meditation, found a medium-sized improvement to daily positive emotion, with meditation on the loving-kindness aspect of mettā having a greater effect than practices with a focus on compassion. The length of time meditating did not affect the magnitude of positive impact of the practice.

=== Caution and reviews ===
S. R. Bishop, in a 2002 review, suggests caution on claims of benefits, and states, "what has been published has been rife with methodological problems. At present, we know very little about the effectiveness of this [mindfulness-lovingkindness-compassion meditation] approach; however, there is some evidence that suggests that it may hold some promise."

In a 2014 review of multiple studies, Galante et al. reach a similar conclusion, stating "results were inconclusive for some outcomes, in particular against active controls; the methodological quality of the reports was low to moderate; results suffered from imprecision due to wide CIs (confidence intervals) deriving from small studies" and that "the kindness meditation methods show evidence of individual and community benefits through its effects on their well-being and social interaction".

== See also ==
- Anapanasati Sutta
- Bhāvanā (contemplation)
- Brahmavihara (Karuṇā, Mudita)
- Kammaṭṭhāna
- Kayagatasati Sutta
- Pāramī (perfection)
  - Adhiṭṭhāna (resolute determination)
  - Dāna (generosity)
  - Khanti (patience)
  - Nekkhamma (renunciation)
  - Pañña (wisdom)
  - Sacca (truth)
  - Śīla (morality)
  - Upekkhā (equanimity)
  - Vīrya (diligence)
- Satipatthana Sutta, also called the Four Satipatthanas
- Similar concepts in other cultures:
  - Caritas - Latin term for love
  - Chesed – a similar Hebrew term, given the association of kindness and love
  - Philia, Philautia, Storge, Eros, Agape - Greek terms for love

== Sources ==
- Acharya Buddharakkhita (trans.) (1987/2006). "Kakacupama Sutta: The Parable of the Saw (excerpt)" from Positive Response: How to Meet Evil With Good (Bodhi Leaves No. 109). Kandy, Sri Lanka: Buddhist Publication Society (1987). Retrieved from "Access to Insight" (2006) at Kakacupama Sutta: The Parable of the Saw.
- Amaravati Sangha (trans.) (1994, 2004). "Karaniya Metta Sutta: The Buddha's Words on Loving-Kindness" from Chanting Book: Morning and Evening Puja and Reflections (1994). Hemel Hempstead: Amaravati Publications. Retrieved 2007-11-25 from "Access to Insight" (2004) at Karaniya Metta Sutta: The Buddha's Words on Loving-Kindness.
- Bodhi, Bhikkhu (2005). In the Buddha's Words: An Anthology of Discourses from the Pali Canon. Somerville, MA: Wisdom Publications. ISBN 0-86171-491-1.
- Buddhaghosa, Bhadantacariya & Bhikkhu Ñāṇamoli (trans.) (1999). The Path of Purification: Visuddhimagga. Seattle, WA: BPS Pariyatti Editions. ISBN 1-928706-00-2.
- Gethin, Rupert (1998). The Foundations of Buddhism. Oxford: Oxford University Press. ISBN 0-19-289223-1.
- Gombrich, Richard (1988; reprinted 2002). Theravada Buddhism: A Social History from Ancient Benares to Modern Colombo. Routledge: London. ISBN 0-415-07585-8.
- Harvey, Peter (2007). An Introduction to Buddhism: Teachings, History and Practices. Cambridge: Cambridge University Press. ISBN 0-521-31333-3.
- Monier-Williams, Monier (1899, 1964). A Sanskrit-English Dictionary. London: Oxford University Press. ISBN 0-19-864308-X. Retrieved 2008-04-29 from "Cologne University" at MW Scan.
- Ñanamoli Thera (ed., trans.) (1987/1994). The Practice of Loving-Kindness (Metta): As Taught by the Buddha in the Pali Canon (The Wheel No. 7). Kandy, Sri Lanka: Buddhist Publication Society (1987). Retrieved 2007-11-25 from "Access to Insight" (1994 transcription) at The Practice of Loving-Kindness (Metta): As Taught by the Buddha in the Pali Canon.
- Ñāṇamoli, Bhikkhu (trans.) & Bhikkhu Bodhi (ed.) (2001). The Middle-Length Discourses of the Buddha: A Translation of the Majjhima Nikāya. Boston: Wisdom Publications. ISBN 0-86171-072-X.
- Ñanamoli Thera (trans.) & Bhikkhu Khantipalo (ed.) (1993/1994). Saleyyaka Sutta: The Brahmans of Sala (MN 41). Retrieved 2007-12-23 from "Access to Insight" (1994 transcription) at Saleyyaka Sutta: The Brahmans of Sala.
- Nyanaponika Thera (trans.) (1988/1998). "Vatthupama Sutta: The Simile of the Cloth" (MN 7) from The Simile of the Cloth & the Discourse on Effacement (Wheel No. 61). Kandy, Sri Lanka: Buddhist Publication Society (1988). Retrieved 2007-12-03 from "Access to Insight" (1998) at Vatthupama Sutta: The Simile of the Cloth.
- Nyanaponika Thera & Bhikkhu Bodhi (trans.) (1999). Numerical Discourses of the Buddha: An anthology of Suttas from the Aṅguttara Nikāya. Walnut Creek, CA: AltaMira Press. ISBN 0-7425-0405-0.
- Rhys Davids, Caroline A. F. ([1900], 2003). Buddhist Manual of Psychological Ethics, of the Fourth Century B.C., Being a Translation, now made for the First Time, from the Original Pāli, of the First Book of the Abhidhamma-Piṭaka, entitled Dhamma-Sangaṇi (Compendium of States or Phenomena). Kessinger Publishing. ISBN 0-7661-4702-9.
- Rhys Davids, T.W. & William Stede (eds.) (1921-5). The Pali Text Society's Pali–English Dictionary. Chipstead: Pali Text Society. Retrieved 2008-04-29 from "U. Chicago" at http://dsal.uchicago.edu/dictionaries/pali/.
- Salzberg, Sharon (1995). Lovingkindness: The Revolutionary Art of Happiness. Boston: Shambhala Publications. ISBN 1-57062-176-4.
- Thanissaro Bhikkhu (trans.) (1994). Raja Sutta: The King (Ud. 5.1). Retrieved 2007-11-25 from "Access to Insight" at Rājan Sutta: The King.
- Thanissaro Bhikkhu (trans.) (1997a). Cunda Kammaraputta Sutta: To Cunda the Silversmith (AN 10.176). Retrieved 2007-11-25 from "Access to Insight" at Cunda Kammaraputta Sutta: To Cunda the Silversmith.
- Thanissaro Bhikkhu (trans.) (1997b). Metta (Mettanisamsa) Sutta: Good Will (AN 11.16). Retrieved 2010-07-07 from "Access to Insight" at Metta (Mettanisamsa) Sutta: Good Will.
- Trungpa, Chögyam (1993). Training the Mind & Cultivating Loving-Kindness. Boston: Shambhala. ISBN 0-87773-954-4.
- Upatissa, Arahant, N.R.M. Ehara (trans.), Soma Thera (trans.) and Kheminda Thera (trans.) (1995). The Path of Freedom (Vimuttimagga). Kandy, Sri Lanka: Buddhist Publication Society. ISBN 955-24-0054-6.
- Walshe, Maurice (1995). The Long Discourses of the Buddha: A Translation of the Dīgha Nikāya. Somerville, MA: Wisdom Publications. ISBN 0-86171-103-3.
- Warder, A. K. (1970; reprinted 2004). Indian Buddhism. Motilal Banarsidass: Delhi. ISBN 81-208-1741-9.

Mon Pali	Mon	Translate
အဟံ အဝေရော ဟောမိ။	နူဘဲပရိုက်အန္တရာဲဂှ် ကဵုအဲဂွံတိတ်ဗၠးအာညိ။	May I be free from enmity and danger.
အဗျာ ပဇ္ဇော ဟောမိ။	နူဒဒိုက်စိုတ်ဂှ် ကဵုအဲဂွံတိတ်ဗၠးအာညိ။	May I be free from mental suffering.
အနဳဃော ဟောမိ၊	နူဒဒိုက်ကာယဂှ် ကဵုအဲဂွံတိတ်ဗၠးအာညိ။	May I be free from physical suffering.
သုခဳ အတ္တာနံ ပရိဟရောမိ။	ဇကုအဲ ကဵုဂွံမၚ်မွဲဗွဲတသိုက်ညိ။	May I be free from myself happily.
မာတာပိတု ဟောန္တု၊	မိမအဲကီု၊	May my parents,
အာစရိယစ၊	အ္စာအဲကီု၊	teacher relatives,
ဉာတိမေတ္တာစ၊	ကလောဒညာတ်မိဿဟာဲအဲကီု၊	and friends,
သရမ္ဘစရိယောစ၊	ညးမဒ္ဂေတ်ဓဝ်မပြဲမွဲစွံကီု၊	follow Dhamma farmers,
အဝေရာ ဟောန္တု၊	ကဵုအဲဂွံတိတ်ဗၠးနူဘဲပရိုက်အန္တရာဲအိုတ်ညိ။	be free from enmity and
အဗျာ ပဇ္ဇာ ဟောန္တု၊	ကဵုဂွံတိတ်ဗၠးနူဒဒိုက်စိုတ်အိုတ်ညိ။	be free from mental suffering,
အနဳဃာ ဟောန္တု၊	ကဵုဂွံတိတ်ဗၠးနူဒဒိုက်ကာယအိုတ်ညိ၊	be free from physical suffering,
သုခဳ အတ္တာနံ ပရိဟာရန္တု၊	ဇကုညးတံကဵုညးတံ ကဵုဂွံမၚ်မွဲဗွဲတသိုက်အိုတ်ညိ၊	may they take care of themselves happily,
ဣမသ္မိံအာရာမေ၊	ပ္ဍဲအရှာံဝွံ ပူဂဵုယောဂဳသီုဖ္အိုတ်ဂမၠိုၚ်၊	May all yogis in this compound,
အဝေရာ ဟောန္တု၊	ကဵုအဲဂွံတိတ်ဗၠးနူဘဲပရိုက်အန္တရာဲအိုတ်ညိ၊	be free from enmity and danger,
အဗျာ ပဇ္ဇာ ဟောန္တု၊	ကဵုဂွံတိတ်ဗၠးနူဒဒိုက်စိုတ်အိုတ်ညိ။	be free from mental suffering,
အနဳဃာ ဟောန္တု၊	ကဵုဂွံတိတ်ဗၠးနူဒဒိုက်ကာယအိုတ်ညိ၊	be free from physical suffering,
သုခဳ အတ္တာနံ ပရိဟာရန္တု၊	ဇကုညးတံကဵုညးတံ ကဵုဂွံမၚ်မွဲဗွဲတသိုက်အိုတ်ညိ၊	may they take care of themselves happily,
ဣမသ္မိံအာရာမေ၊	ပ္ဍဲအရှာံဝွံ ခမဳဂမၠိုၚ်သီုဖ္အိုတ်ကီု။	May all monks in this compound
သမဏောရေစ၊	ထပိုယ်ဂမၠိုၚ် သီုဖ္အိုတ်ကီု၊	novice monks,
ဥပါသကာ ဥပါသိကာစ၊	ဥပ္ပးတြုံ ဗြဴဂမၠိုၚ်ကီု၊	laymen and laywomen disciples
အဝေရာ ဟောန္တု၊	ကဵုအဲဂွံတိတ်ဗၠးနူဘဲပရိုက်အန္တရာဲအိုတ်ညိ၊	be free from enmity and danger,
အဗျာ ပဇ္ဇာ ဟောန္တု၊	ကဵုဂွံတိတ်ဗၠးနူဒဒိုက်စိုတ်အိုတ်ညိ။	be free from mental suffering,
