= Kammaṭṭhāna =

Type of Buddhist meditation and objects used in such meditation

In Buddhism, kammaṭṭhāna (Pali: 𑀓𑀫𑁆𑀫𑀝𑁆𑀞𑀸𑀦, Sanskrit: 𑀓𑀭𑁆𑀫𑀲𑁆𑀣𑀸𑀦, romanized: karmasthāna) literally means place of work. Its original meaning was someone's occupation (farming, trading, cattle-tending, etc.) but this meaning has developed into several distinct but related usages all having to do with Buddhist meditation.

== Etymology and meanings ==
Its most basic meaning is as a word for meditation, with meditation being the main occupation of Buddhist monks. In Burma, senior meditation practitioners are known as "kammatthanacariyas" (meditation masters). The Thai Forest Tradition names itself Kammaṭṭhāna Forest tradition in reference to their practice of meditating in the forests.

In the Pali literature, prior to the post-canonical Pali commentaries, the term kammaṭṭhāna comes up in only a handful of discourses and then in the context of "work" or "trade." (Note: For instance, in the first three nikayas, the term is found only in the Subha Sutta (MN 99), although there it is found 22 times. In this discourse, it is contextualized, for instance, in this question to the Buddha by the Brahmin Subha: "Master Gotama, the brahmins say this: 'Since the work of the household life [Pali: gharāvāsa-kammaṭṭhāna] involves a great deal of activity, great functions, great engagements, and great undertakings, it is of great fruit. Since the work of those gone forth [Pali: pabbajjā-kammaṭṭhāna] involves a small amount of activity, small functions, small engagements, and small undertakings, it is of small fruit.' What does Master Gotama say about this?" Similarly, in the famed Dighajanu Sutta (AN 8.54): "And what does it mean to be consummate in initiative? There is the case where a lay person, by whatever occupation he makes his living [Pali: yena kammaṭṭhānena jīvikaṃ kappeti] — whether by farming or trading or cattle tending or archery or as a king's man or by any other craft — is clever and untiring at it, endowed with discrimination in its techniques, enough to arrange and carry it out. This is called being consummate in initiative." An identical phrasing can be found in the very next discourse, the Ujjaya Sutta (AN 8.55), and in the Dutiya Sampadā Sutta (AN 8.76) A last canonical use of this term can be found in the Sakya Sutta (AN 10.46): "What do you think, Sakyans. Suppose a man, by some profession or other [Pali: yena kenaci kammaṭṭhānena], without encountering an unskillful day, were to earn a half-kahapana. Would he deserve to be called a capable man, full of initiative?")

Buddhaghosa uses kammatthana to refer to each of his forty meditation objects listed in the third chapter of the Visuddhimagga, which are partially derived from the Pāli Canon. In this sense kammatthana can be understood as "occupations" in the sense of "things to occupy the mind", or as "workplaces" in the sense of "places to focus the mind on during the work of meditation". Throughout his translation of the Visuddhimagga, Ñāṇamoli translates this term simply as "meditation subject".

== Buddhaghosa's forty meditation subjects ==
=== Kasiṇas as kammaṭṭhāna ===
Kasina (Pali: 𑀓𑀲𑀺𑀦, romanized: kasina, lit. 'a whole', Sanskrit: 𑀓𑀾𑀢𑁆𑀲𑁆𑀦, romanized: kṛtsna) refers to a class of basic visual objects of meditation used in Theravada Buddhism. The objects are described in the Pali Canon and summarized in the famous Visuddhimagga meditation treatise as kammaṭṭhāna on which to focus the mind whenever attention drifts. Kasina meditation is one of the most common types of samatha-vipassana, intended to settle the mind of the practitioner and create a foundation for further practices of meditation. This is similar to the yogic practice of Trāṭaka

The Visuddhimagga concerns kasina meditation. According to American scholar-monk Ṭhānissaro Bhikkhu, "the text then tries to fit all other meditation methods into the mold of kasina practice, so that they too give rise to countersigns, but even by its own admission, breath meditation does not fit well into the mold." He argues that by emphasizing kasina meditation, the Visuddhimagga departs from the focus on jhāna in the Pali Canon. Thanissaro Bhikkhu states this indicates that what "jhana means in the commentaries is something quite different from what it means in the Canon."

Although practice with kasiṇas is associated with the Theravāda tradition, it appears to have been more widely known among various Buddhist schools in India at one time. Asanga makes reference to kasiṇas in the Samāhitabhūmi section of his Yogācārabhūmi-Śāstra. Uppalavannā, one of the Buddha's chief female disciples, famously attained arahantship using a fire (tejo) kasina as her object of meditation.

Of the forty objects meditated upon as kammaṭṭhāna, the first ten are kasina described as 'things one can behold directly'. These are described in the Visuddhimagga, and also mentioned in the Pali Tipitaka. They are:

1. earth (𑀧𑀞𑀯𑀻 𑀓𑀲𑀺𑀦; Pali: paṭhavī kasina, Sanskrit: pṛthivī kṛtsna)
2. water (𑀆𑀧𑁄 𑀓𑀲𑀺𑀦; āpo kasiṇa, ap kṛtsna)
3. fire (𑀢𑁂𑀚𑁄 𑀓𑀲𑀺𑀦; tejo kasiṇa, tejas kṛtsna)
4. air/wind (𑀯𑀸𑀬𑁄 𑀓𑀲𑀺𑀦; vāyo kasiṇa, vāyu kṛtsna)
5. blue (𑀦𑀻𑀮 𑀓𑀲𑀺𑀦; nīla kasiṇa, nīla kṛtsna)
6. yellow 𑀧𑀻𑀢 𑀓𑀲𑀺𑀦; pīta kasiṇa, pīta kṛtsna)
7. red (𑀮𑁄𑀳𑀺𑀢 𑀓𑀲𑀺𑀦; lohita kasiṇa, lohita kṛtsna)
8. white (𑀑𑀤𑀸𑀢 𑀓𑀲𑀺𑀦; odāta kasiṇa, avadāta kṛtsna)
9. enclosed space, hole, aperture (𑀆𑀓𑀸𑀲 𑀓𑀲𑀺𑀦; ākāsa kasiṇa, ākāśa kṛtsna)
10. consciousness (𑀯𑀺𑀜𑁆𑀜𑀸𑀡 𑀓𑀲𑀺𑀦; viññāṇa kasiṇa, vijñāna kṛtsna) in the Pali suttas and some other texts; the bright light (of the luminous mind) (𑀆𑀮𑁄𑀓 𑀓𑀲𑀺𑀦; āloka kasiṇa) according to later sources such as Buddhaghosa's Visuddhimagga.

The kasinas are typically described as a coloured disk, with the particular colour, properties, dimensions and medium often specified according to the type of kasina. The earth kasina, for instance, is a disk in a red-brown color formed by spreading earth or clay (or another medium producing similar color and texture) on a screen of canvas or another backing material.

=== Asubha ===
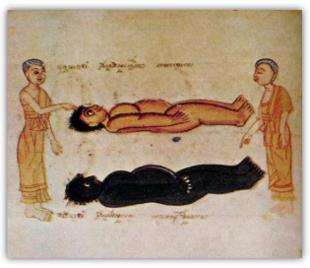
Illustration of the first two asubha contemplations: bloated corpse and discolored, bluish corpse. From an early 20th century manuscript found in Chaiya District, Surat Thani Province, Thailand

The next ten are the impure objects (asubha): (Note: The classification of asubha here is based on the classification of kammaṭṭhāna as found in the treatise Visuddhimagga. Within the system of 40 kammaṭṭhāna, the 10 asubha (corpse objects) constitute a post-canonical codification that compiles 10 corpse terms from 10 separate suttas in the Saṃyutta Nikāya (SN 46.57 to SN 46.66). This system is textually distinct from the term asubhasaññā in the Aṅguttara Nikāya—where AN 10.56 lists it as one of ten general perceptions and AN 10.60 defines it as the contemplation of the body's ugly anatomical parts (asubhānupassī)—as well as from the category of the Nine Stages of Corpse Decay (Nava-Sīvathikā) in the Satipaṭṭhāna Sutta.)

1. a swollen corpse
2. a discolored, bluish, corpse
3. a festering corpse
4. a fissured corpse
5. a gnawed corpse
6. a dismembered corpse
7. a hacked and scattered corpse
8. a bleeding corpse
9. a worm-eaten corpse
10. a skeleton

=== Anussati ===
The next ten are recollections (anussati):

1. First three recollections are of the virtues of the Three Jewels:
  1. Buddha
  2. Dhamma
  3. Sangha
2. Next three are recollections of the virtues of:
  1. morality (sīla)
  2. generosity/relinquishment (cāga)
  3. the skillful qualities of Devas (devatā)
3. The additional four recollections of:
  1. the body (kāya), which technically focuses on the 'contemplation of repulsiveness' (paṭikkūlamanasikāra) regarding the thirty-two anatomical parts of the living body
  2. death (see Upajjhatthana Sutta)
  3. the breath (pāṇa) or breathing (ānāpāna)
  4. peace (see Nibbana)

=== Brahma-vihārā ===
Four are 'divine abidings', which are the virtues of the "Brahma realm" (Pāli: Brahmaloka):

1. unconditional kindness and goodwill (mettā)
2. compassion (karuna)
3. sympathetic joy over another's success (mudita)
4. evenmindedness, equanimity (upekkha)

=== Āyatana ===
Four are formless states (four arūpa-āyatana):

1. infinite space (Pāḷi ākāsānañcāyatana, Skt. ākāśānantyāyatana)
2. infinite consciousness (Pāḷi viññāṇañcāyatana, Skt. vijñānānantyāyatana)
3. infinite nothingness (Pāḷi ākiñcaññāyatana, Skt. ākiṃcanyāyatana)
4. neither perception nor non-perception (Pāḷi nevasaññānāsaññāyatana, Skt. naivasaṃjñānāsaṃjñāyatana)

=== Others ===
Of the remaining five, one is of perception of disgust of food (aharepatikulasanna) and the last four are the 'four great elements' (catudhatuvavatthana): earth (pathavi), water (apo), fire (tejo), air (vayo).

== Meditation subjects and the four jhānas ==
Table: Factors of rūpa jhāna
Cetasika (mental factors)	First jhāna	Second jhāna	Third jhāna	Fourth jhāna
Kāma / Akusala dhamma (sensuality / unskillful qualities)	secluded from; withdrawn	does not occur	does not occur	does not occur
Pīti (rapture)	seclusion-born; pervades body	samādhi-born; pervades body	fades away (along with distress)	does not occur
Sukha (non-sensual pleasure)	seclusion-born; pervades body	samādhi-born; pervades body	pervades physical body	abandoned (no pleasure nor pain)
Vitakka ("applied thought")	accompanies jhāna	unification of awareness free from vitakka and vicāra	does not occur	does not occur
Vicāra ("sustained thought")	accompanies jhāna	unification of awareness free from vitakka and vicāra	does not occur	does not occur
Upekkhāsatipārisuddhi (pure, mindful equanimity)	does not occur	internal confidence	equanimous; mindful	purity of equanimity and mindfulness

According to Gunaratana, following Buddhaghosa, due to the simplicity of subject matter, all four jhanas can be induced through ānāpānasati (mindfulness of breathing) and the ten kasinas.

According to Gunaratana, the following meditation subjects only lead to "access concentration" (upacara samadhi), due to their complexity: the recollection of the Buddha, dharma, sangha, morality, liberality, wholesome attributes of Devas, death, and peace; the perception of disgust of food; and the analysis of the four elements.

Absorption in the first jhana can be realized by mindfulness on the ten kinds of foulness and mindfulness of the body. However, these meditations cannot go beyond the first jhana due to their involving applied thought (vitaka), which is absent from the higher jhanas.

Absorption in the first three jhanas can be realized by contemplating the first three brahma-viharas. However, these meditations cannot aid in attaining the fourth jhana due to the pleasant feelings associated with them. Conversely, once the fourth jhana is induced, the fourth brahma-vihara (equanimity) arises.

== Meditation subjects and temperaments ==
Each kammatthana can be suggested, especially by a spiritual friend (kalyāṇa-mitta), to a certain individual student at some specific point, by assessing what would be best for that student's temperament and the present state of his or her mind.

All of the aforementioned meditation subjects can suppress the Five Hindrances, thus allowing one to fruitfully pursue wisdom. In addition, anyone can productively apply specific meditation subjects as antidotes, such as meditating on foulness to counteract lust or on the breath to abandon discursive thought.

The Pali commentaries further provide guidelines for suggesting meditation subjects based on one's general temperament:

- Greedy: the ten foulness meditations; or, body contemplation.
- Hating: the four brahma-viharas; or, the four color kasinas.
- Deluded: mindfulness of breath.
- Faithful: the first six recollections.
- Intelligent: recollection of marana or Nibbana; the perception of disgust of food; or, the analysis of the four elements.
- Speculative: mindfulness of breath.

The six non-color kasinas and the four formless states are suitable for all temperaments.

== Supernormal abilities ==
The Visuddhimagga is one of the rare texts within the literature of Buddhism which gives explicit details about how spiritual masters are thought to actually manifest supernormal abilities. Abilities such as flying through the air, walking through solid obstructions, diving into the ground, walking on water and so forth are performed by changing one element, such as earth, into another element, such as air. The individual must master kasina meditation before this is possible. Dipa Ma, who trained via the Visuddhimagga, was said to demonstrate these abilities.

== See also ==
- Anussati
- Upajjhatthana Sutta (Five Remembrances)
- Ānāpānasati Sutta (Contemplation of the breath)
- Kāyagatāsati Sutta (Contemplation of the body)
- Patikkulamanasikara
- Gradual training (Patipatti)
- Buddhist meditation
- Jhana in Theravada
- Anapanasati
- Samatha
- Vipassanā
