= Bhavana =

Concept in Indian religions, signifying contemplation and spiritual cultivation

Bhāvanā (Pali; Sanskrit: भावना, also bhāvanā) literally means "development" or "cultivating" or "producing" in the sense of "calling into existence". It is an important concept in Buddhist practice (Patipatti). The word bhavana normally appears in conjunction with another word forming a compound phrase such as citta-bhavana (the development or cultivation of the heart/mind) or metta-bhavana (the development/cultivation of loving-kindness). When used on its own, bhavana signifies contemplation and 'spiritual cultivation' generally.

== Etymology ==
Bhavana derives from the word Bhava meaning becoming or the subjective process of arousing mental states.

To explain the cultural context of the historical Buddha's employment of the term, Glenn Wallis emphasizes bhavana's sense of cultivation. He writes that a farmer performs bhavana when he or she prepares soil and plants a seed. Wallis infers the Buddha's intention with this term by emphasizing the terrain and focus on farming in northern India at the time in the following passage:

I imagine that when Gotama, the Buddha, chose this word to talk about meditation, he had in mind the ubiquitous farms and fields of his native India. Unlike our words 'meditation' or 'contemplation,' Gotama’s term is musty, rich, and verdant. It smells of the earth. The commonness of his chosen term suggests naturalness, everydayness, ordinariness. The term also suggests hope: no matter how fallow it has become, or damaged it may be, a field can always be cultivated — endlessly enhanced, enriched, developed — to produce a favorable and nourishing harvest.

== Hinduism ==
In Hindu literature, bhavana is a concept that is often attributed to deities, such as Krishna in the Bhagavad Gita:

O Puruṣottama, Supreme Person! O Bhūta-bhāvana, creator of beings! O Bhūteśa, father of all created beings! O Deva-deva, God of gods! O Jagat-pati, Master of the universe! You alone know Yourself by Your own potency.

— Attributed to Vyasa, Bhagavad Gita, Chapter 10, Verse 10.15

== Buddhism ==
In the Pali Canon bhāvanā is often found in a compound phrase indicating personal, intentional effort over time with respect to the development of that particular faculty. For instance, in the Pali Canon and post-canonical literature one can find the following compounds:

- citta-bhāvanā, translated as "development of mind" or "development of consciousness."
- kāya-bhāvanā, translated as "development of body."
- mettā-bhāvanā, translated as the "cultivation" or "development of benevolence."
- paññā-bhāvanā, translated as "development of wisdom" or "development of understanding."
- samādhi-bhāvanā, translated as "development of concentration."

In addition, in the Canon, the development (bhāvanā) of samatha-vipassana is lauded. Subsequently, Theravada teachers have made use of the following compounds:

- samatha-bhāvanā, meaning the development of tranquility.
- vipassanā-bhāvanā, meaning the development of insight.

The word bhavana is sometimes translated into English as 'meditation' so that, for example, metta-bhavana may be translated as 'the meditation on loving-kindness'. Meditation is properly called dhyana (Sanskrit; Pali: jhāna), as practiced in samādhi, the 8th limb of the eightfold path.

== Jainism ==
In Jainism, bhāvana refers to "right conception or notion" or "the moral of a fable".

== See also ==
- Ānāpānasati (Ānāpānasati Sutta)
- Anussati
- Samatha
- Vipassanā
- Metta Sutta
- Mangala Sutta
- Buddhist meditation
- Self-cultivation

== Sources ==
- Ireland, John D. (trans.) (1997). The Udāna & the Itivuttaka. Kandy: Buddhist Publication Society. ISBN 955-24-0164-X. Retrieved 9 December 2008 from "Access to Insight" (1999, excerpts) at http://www.accesstoinsight.org/tipitaka/kn/iti/iti.intro.irel.html.
- Monier-Williams, Monier (1899, 1964). A Sanskrit-English Dictionary. London: Oxford University Press. ISBN 0-19-864308-X. Retrieved 2008-12-09 from "Cologne University" at http://www.sanskrit-lexicon.uni-koeln.de/scans/MWScan/index.php?sfx=pdf.
- Ñāṇamoli, Bhikkhu (trans.) & Bodhi, Bhikkhu (ed.) (2001). The Middle-Length Discourses of the Buddha: A Translation of the Majjhima Nikāya. Boston: Wisdom Publications. ISBN 0-86171-072-X.
- Nyanatiloka Mahathera, Buddhist Dictionary: Manual of Terms And Doctrines, Buddhist Publication Society, Kandy, Sri Lanka, fourth Edition, 1980
- Nyanaponika Thera (trans.) & Bhikkhu Bodhi (trans., ed.) (1999). Numerical Discourses of the Buddha: An Anthology of Suttas from the Aṇguttara Nikāya. Walnut Creek, CA: AltaMira Press. ISBN 0-7425-0405-0.
- Rhys Davids, T.W. & William Stede (eds.) (1921–5). The Pali Text Society’s Pali–English Dictionary. Chipstead: Pali Text Society. Retrieved 2008-12-09 from "U. Chicago" at http://dsal.uchicago.edu/dictionaries/pali/.
- Thanissaro Bhikkhu (trans.) (1995). Pabhassara Sutta: Luminous (AN 1.49–52). Retrieved 9 December 2008 from "Access to Insight" at http://www.accesstoinsight.org/tipitaka/an/an01/an01.049.than.html.
- Thanissaro Bhikkhu (trans.) (1997). Samadhi Sutta: Concentration (AN 4.41). Retrieved 11 December 2008 from "Access to Insight" at http://www.accesstoinsight.org/tipitaka/an/an04/an04.041.than.html.
- Thanissaro Bhikkhu (trans.) (1998a). Culavedalla Sutta: The Shorter Set of Questions-and-Answers (MN 44). Retrieved 11 December 2008 from "Access to Insight" at http://www.accesstoinsight.org/tipitaka/mn/mn.044.than.html.
- Thanissaro Bhikkhu (trans.) (1998b). Yuganaddha Sutta: In Tandem (AN 4.170). Retrieved 11 December 2008 from "Access to Insight" at http://www.accesstoinsight.org/tipitaka/an/an04/an04.170.than.html.
- Thanissaro, Bhikkhu (trans.) (2004). Karaniya Metta Sutta: Good Will (Sn 1.8). Retrieved 9 December 2008 from "Access to Insight" at http://www.accesstoinsight.org/tipitaka/kn/snp/snp.1.08.than.html.
- Thanissaro Bhikkhu (trans.) (2006). Ekadhamma Suttas: A Single Thing (AN 1.21–24). Retrieved 9 December 2008 from "Access to Insight" at http://www.accesstoinsight.org/tipitaka/an/an01/an01.021-040.than.html.
- Walshe, Maurice (1995). The Long Discourses of the Buddha: A Translation of the Dīgha Nikāya. Somerville, MA: Wisdom Publications. ISBN 0-86171-103-3.
