= Anussati =

Type of meditational and devotional practices

Anussati (Pāli; Sanskrit: Anusmṛti; Chinese: 隨念; pinyin: suíniàn; Tibetan: རྗེས་སུ་དྲན་པ, Wylie: rjes su dran pa) means "recollection," "contemplation," "remembrance," "meditation", and "mindfulness". It refers to specific Buddhist meditational or devotional practices, such as recollecting the sublime qualities of the Buddha, which lead to mental tranquillity and abiding joy. In various contexts, the Pali literature and Sanskrit Mahayana sutras emphasise and identify different enumerations of recollections.

Anussati may also refer to meditative attainments, such as the ability to recollect past lives (pubbenivāsānussati), also called causal memory. (Note: A stock phrase in the Nikayas says that one accomplished in dhyana recalls one's own past lives, as a prelude to awakening. In this case, anussati is not a meditative subject to achieve jhanic absorption or devotional bliss; it is the actual fruit of practice. An example of one who has achieved such a power is described in the following manner by the Buddha in the "Lohicca Sutta" (DN 12): "With his mind thus concentrated, purified, & bright, unblemished, free from defects, pliant, malleable, steady, & attained to imperturbability, he directs & inclines it to knowledge of the recollection of past lives (lit. 'previous homes'). He recollects his manifold past lives, i.e., one birth, two births, three births, four, five, ten, twenty, thirty, forty, fifty, one hundred, one thousand, one hundred thousand, many aeons of cosmic contraction, many aeons of cosmic expansion, many aeons of cosmic contraction & expansion, [recollecting], 'There I had such a name, belonged to such a clan, had such an appearance. Such was my food, such my experience of pleasure & pain, such the end of my life. Passing away from that state, I re-arose there. There too I had such a name, belonged to such a clan, had such an appearance. Such was my food, such my experience of pleasure & pain, such the end of my life. Passing away from that state, I re-arose here.' Thus he recollects his manifold past lives in their modes & details....")

== Grouping ==
=== Three recollections ===
The three recollections:

- Recollection of the Buddha (Pali: buddhānussati; Sanskrit: buddhanusmrti; Tibetan: སངས་རྒྱས་རྗེས་སུ་དྲན་པ, Wylie: sangs rgyas rjes su dran pa)
- Recollection of the Dhamma (Pi. dhammānussati; Skt. dharmanusmrti; Tib. ཆོས་རྗེས་སུ་དྲན་པ chos rjes su dran pa)
- Recollection of the Sangha (Pi. saṅghānussati; Skt. sanghanusmrti; Tib. དགེ་འདུན་རྗེས་སུ་དྲན་པ dge 'dun rjes su dran pa) (Note: For an example, see reference to this type of recollection in Dhammapada, Ch. 21, vv. 296-8)

The Dhammapada (Verse 296, 297 & 298) declares that the Buddha's disciples who constantly practice recollection of the Triple Gem "ever awaken happily". According to the Theragatha, such a practice will lead to "the height of continual joy".

Unlike other subjects of meditative recollection mentioned in this article, the Triple Gem are considered "devotional contemplations". The Triple Gem are listed as the first three subjects of recollection for each of the following lists as well.

=== Five recollections ===
On uposatha days, in addition to practicing the Eight Precepts, the Buddha enjoined a disciple to engage in one or more of five recollections:

- Recollection of the Buddha
- Recollection of the Dhamma
- Recollection of the Sangha
- Recollection of virtues (Pi. sīlānussati; Tib. ཚུལ་ཁྲིམས་རྗེས་སུ་དྲན་པ tshul khrims rjes su dran pa)
- Recollection of the devas (Pi. devatānussati; Tib. ལྷ་རྗེས་སུ་དྲན་པ lha rjes su dran pa)

According to the Buddha, for one who practices such recollections: "his mind is calmed, and joy arises; the defilements of his mind are abandoned".

=== Six recollections ===
The six recollections are:

- Recollection of the Buddha
- Recollection of the Dhamma
- Recollection of the Sangha
- Recollection of generosity (Pi. cāgānussati; Tib. གཏོང་བ་རྗེས་སུ་དྲན་པ gtong ba rjes su dran pa)
- Recollection of virtues
- Recollection of the devas

The Buddha tells a disciple that the mind of one who practices these recollections "is not overcome with passion, not overcome with aversion, not overcome with delusion. (Note: For more information about the import of passion, aversion, and delusion in Buddhism, see kilesa.) His mind heads straight, ... gains joy connected with the Dhamma..., rapture arises..., the body grows calm ... experiences ease..., the mind becomes concentrated". (Note: As suggested by this quote and discussed further below, Gunaratana 1988 states that meditation on these recollected subjects leads to "access concentration" but not to higher jhanic attainment.)

In Mahayana Buddhist practices, the first six recollections were commonly taught and the Buddha anussati was particularly emphasised in many popular sutras such as the Medicine Buddha sutra.

=== Ten recollections ===
As ten recollections, the following are added to the previous six recollections:

- Recollection of death (maraṇānussati) or mindfulness of death (maraṇasati)
- Mindfulness of the breath (ānāpānassati) (Note: For canonical material associated with the recollections of death, body, and breath Bullitt 2005 refers readers to the mindfulness (sati) practices identified in the Satipatthana Sutta.)
- Mindfulness of the body (kāyagatāsati)
- Recollection of peace (upasamānussati)

In the Pali canon's Aṅguttara Nikāya, it is stated that the practice of any one of these ten recollections leads to nibbana (Sanskrit: nirvana). The Ten Recollections are listed among the kammaṭṭhāna, forty classic meditation subjects listed in the Visuddhimagga useful for developing concentration needed to suppress and destroy the five hindrances during ones pursuit of nibbana. (Note: See, for instance, Buddhaghosa 1999, p. 90, ff.) Although the Pali canon refers to mindfulness of death (maraṇāsati), the Visuddhimagga refers to the recollection of death (maraṇānussati).

In terms of the development of meditative absorption, mindfulness of the breath can lead to all four jhanas, mindfulness of the body can lead only to the first jhana, while the eight other recollections culminate in pre-jhanic "access concentration" (upacara samadhi).

The recollection of death is connected with the Buddhist concept of non-self: devotees recollect on the inevitability of their own demise, and in that way learn to understand that their physical body is not a permanent self. To often reflect in such a way, is believed to strongly affect the devotee's motivations and priorities in life, and to help the devotee become more realistic.

== Recollections ==
=== Recollection of the Buddha (Buddhanussati) ===
The Aṅguttara Nikāya provides the following verse (gatha) for the recollection the Buddha:

"Indeed, the Blessed One is worthy and rightly self-awakened, consummate in knowledge & conduct, well-gone, an expert with regard to the world, unexcelled as a trainer for those people fit to be tamed, the Teacher of divine & human beings, awakened, blessed."

— Mahanama Sutta (Aṅguttara Nikāya 11.12)

It has been suggested that the recollection of the Buddha identified in the Theravādin's Pāli Canon might have been the basis for the more elaborately visual contemplations typical of Tibetan Buddhism. (Note: For an example of the subject of a typically Tibetan Buddhist visualisation, see Tara (Buddhism).)

=== Recollection of the Dhamma (Dhammanussati) ===
The Aṅguttara Nikāya provides the following verse for the recollection of the Dhamma:

"The Dhamma is well-expounded by the Blessed One, to be seen here & now, timeless, inviting verification, pertinent, to be realized by the wise for themselves."

— Mahanama Sutta (Aṅguttara Nikāya 11.12)

The Teaching of the Buddha has six supreme qualities:

1. Svākkhāto (Sanskrit: Svākhyāta; "well-expounded, well-proclaimed, or self-announced"). The Buddha's teaching is not a speculative philosophy but an exposition of the Universal Law of Nature based on a causal analysis of natural phenomena. It is taught, therefore, as a science rather than a sectarian belief system. Full comprehension (enlightenment) of the teaching may take varying lengths of time but Buddhists traditionally say that the course of study is 'excellent in the beginning (sīla; Sanskrit: śīla; "moral principles"), excellent in the middle (Sanskrit: samādhi; "concentration") and excellent in the end' (paññā; Sanskrit: prajñā; "wisdom").
2. Sandiṭṭhiko (Sanskrit: Sāṃdṛṣṭika; "able to be examined"). The Dhamma is open to scientific and other types of scrutiny and is not based on faith. (Note: The Buddha had in fact required that his teaching be scrutinised to see for oneself. "Thathagathappavedito bhikkave dhamma vinayo vivato virochathi, no patichchanto." "The Dhamma vinaya of the Tathagata shines when opened for scrutiny, not when kept closed." Anguttara Nikayo, Thika Nipatho, Harandu vaggo, Sutta 9) It can be tested by personal practice and one who follows it will see the result for oneself by means of one's own experience. Sandiṭṭhiko comes from the word sandiṭṭhika which means "visible in this world" and is derived from the word sandiṭṭhi. Since the Dhamma is visible, it can be "seen": known and be experienced within one's life.
3. Akāliko (Sanskrit: Akālika; "timeless, immediate"). The Dhamma is able to bestow timeless and immediate results here and now. There is no need to wait for the future or a next existence. The Dhamma does not change over time and it is not relative to time.
4. Ehipassiko (Sanskrit: Ehipaśyika; "which you can come and see" — from the phrase ehi, paśya, "come, see!"). The Dhamma invites all beings to put it to the test and come see for themselves.
5. Opanayiko (Sanskrit: Avapraṇayika; "leading one close to"). Followed as a part of one's life the dhamma leads one to liberation. In the "Vishuddhimagga" this is also referred to as "Upanayanam." Opanayiko means "to be brought inside oneself". This can be understood with an analogy as follows. If one says a ripe mango tastes delicious, and if several people listen and come to believe it, they would imagine the taste of the mango according to their previous experiences of other delicious mangoes. Yet, they will still not really know exactly how this mango tastes. Also, if there is a person who has never tasted a ripe mango before, that person has no way of knowing exactly for himself how it tastes. So, the only way to know the exact taste is to experience it. In the same way, dhamma is said to be opanayiko which means that a person needs to experience it within to see exactly what it is.
6. Paccattaṃ veditabbo viññūhi (Sanskrit: Pratyātmaṃ veditavyo vijñaiḥ; "to be meant to perceive directly"). The Dhamma is "to be realised by the wise for themselves". It can be perfectly realised only by the noble disciples (ariya-puggala) who have matured in supreme wisdom. No one can "enlighten" another person. Each intelligent person has to attain and experience for themselves. As an analogy, no one can simply make another know how to swim. Each person individually has to learn how to swim. In the same way, dhamma cannot be transferred or bestowed upon someone. Each one has to know for themselves.

Knowing these attributes, Buddhists believe that they will attain the greatest peace and happiness through the practice of the Dhamma. Therefore, each person is fully responsible for his or her self to put it into practice for real.

Here the Buddha is compared to an experienced and skillful doctor, and the Dhamma to proper medicine. However efficient the doctor or wonderful the medicine may be, the patients cannot be cured unless they take the medicine properly. So the practice of the Dhamma is the only way to attain the final deliverance of nibbāna.

These teachings ranged from understanding kamma (Sanskrit: karma; lit. 'action') and developing good impressions in one's mind, to reach full enlightenment by recognising the nature of mind.

=== Recollection of the Sangha (Sanghanussati) ===
The Aṅguttara Nikāya provides the following verses for the recollection of the Sangha:

"The Sangha of the Blessed One's disciples who have practiced well... who have practiced straight-forwardly... who have practiced methodically... who have practiced masterfully — in other words, the four types [of noble disciples] when taken as pairs, the eight when taken as individual types — they are the Sangha of the Blessed One's disciples: worthy of gifts, worthy of hospitality, worthy of offerings, worthy of respect, the incomparable field of merit for the world."

— Mahanama Sutta (Aṅguttara Nikāya 11.12)

I'm fortunate, so very fortunate, to have good friends who advise and instruct me out of kindness and compassion.

— Nandiya Sutta (Aṅguttara Nikāya 11.13)

Practicing masterfully, or practicing with integrity, means sharing what they have learned with others.

=== Recollection of virtues (Silanussati) ===
The Aṅguttara Nikāya provides the following verse for the recollection of virtues:

"[They are] untorn, unbroken, unspotted, unsplattered, liberating, praised by the wise, untarnished, conducive to concentration."

— Mahanama Sutta (Aṅguttara Nikāya 11.12)

=== Recollection of generosity (Caganussati) ===
The Aṅguttara Nikāya provides the following verse for the recollection of generosity:

"It is a gain, a great gain for me, that — among people overcome with the stain of possessiveness — I live at home, my awareness cleansed of the stain of possessiveness, freely generous, openhanded, delighting in being magnanimous, responsive to requests, delighting in the distribution of alms."

— Mahanama Sutta (Aṅguttara Nikāya 11.12)

=== Recollection of devas (Devatanussati) ===
The Aṅguttara Nikāya provides the following verses for the recollection of the devas:

"There are the devas of the Four Great Kings, the devas of the Thirty-three, the devas of the Hours, the Contented Devas, the devas who delight in creation, the devas who have power over the creations of others, the devas of Brahma's retinue, the devas beyond them. Whatever conviction they were endowed with that — when falling away from this life — they re-arose there, the same sort of conviction is present in me as well. Whatever virtue they were endowed with that — when falling away from this life — they re-arose there, the same sort of virtue is present in me as well. Whatever learning they were endowed with that — when falling away from this life — they re-arose there, the same sort of learning is present in me as well. Whatever generosity they were endowed with that — when falling away from this life — they re-arose there, the same sort of generosity is present in me as well. Whatever discernment they were endowed with that — when falling away from this life — they re-arose there, the same sort of discernment is present in me as well."

— Mahanama Sutta (Aṅguttara Nikāya 11.12)

"There are deities who, surpassing the company of deities that consume solid food, are reborn in a certain host of mind-made deities. They don't see in themselves anything more to do, or anything that needs improvement."

— Nandiya Sutta (Aṅguttara Nikāya 11.13)

== See also ==
- Dhammapada (verses 296 to 301)
- Upajjhatthana Sutta (Five Remembrances)
- Ānāpānasati Sutta (Mindfulness of the breath)
- Kāyagatāsati Sutta (Mindfulness of the body)
- Patikkulamanasikara
- Gradual training (Patipatti)
- Jarāmaraṇa (Aging and death)
- Rebirth (Buddhism)

== Bibliography ==
- Anālayo (2006). Satipaṭṭhāna: The Direct Path to Realization. Birmingham, England: Windhorse Publications. ISBN 1-899579-54-0.
- Buddharakkhita, Acharya (trans.) (1996), Pakinnakavagga: Miscellaneous (Dhammapada 21) Available online at www.accesstoinsight.org/tipitaka/kn/dhp/dhp.21.budd.html.
- Buddhaghosa (1999). The Path of Purification: Visuddhimagga. Translated by Bhadantacariya; Nanamoli. Seattle: BPS Pariyatti Editions. ISBN 1-928706-00-2.
- Bullitt, John T. (2005), General Index: Ten Recollections Available online at www.accesstoinsight.org/index-subject.html#recollections.
- Fischer-Schreiber, Ingrid; Ehrhard, Franz-Karl; Diener, Michael S. (1991). The Shambhala Dictionary of Buddhism and Zen. Translated by Kohn, Michael H. Boston: Shambhala. ISBN 0-87773-520-4.
- Goenka, S. N. (2003). Meditation Now: Inner Peace through Inner Wisdom. Pariyatti Publishing. ISBN 978-1-938754-35-7.
- Gunaratana, Henepola (1988). The Jhanas in Theravada Buddhist Meditation. Kandy, Sri Lanka: Buddhist Publication Society. ISBN 955-24-0035-X. Available online at www.budsas.org/ebud/jhanas/jhanas0a.htm.
- Goodman, Charles (2013). "Buddhist Meditation" (PDF). In Emmanuel, Steven M. (ed.). A Companion to Buddhist Philosophy. Chichester, West Sussex: Wiley-Blackwell. p. 569. ISBN 978-0-470-65877-2. Archived from the original (PDF) on March 16, 2015.
- Harvey, Peter (2013). "Dukkha, non-self, and the "Four Noble Truths"" (PDF). In Emmanuel, Steven M. (ed.). A Companion to Buddhist Philosophy. Chichester, West Sussex: Wiley-Blackwell. p. 35. ISBN 978-0-470-65877-2. Archived from the original (PDF) on March 16, 2015.
- Kamalashila, Dharmachari (1996). Meditation: the Buddhist way of tranquillity and insight (2nd ed.). Birmingham: Windhorse. ISBN 1-899579-05-2. Archived 5 April 2005 at the Wayback Machine.
- Kumar, Bimalendra (2002). "Anusmriti in Theravada and Mahayana Texts". Buddhist Himalaya. 11. Archived from the original on 25 October 2005.
- Mahathera, Nyanatiloka (1980). "Anussati" (PDF). Buddhist Dictionary: Manual of Buddhist Terms and Doctrines (4th revised ed.). Kandy, Sri Lanka: Buddhist Publication Society. pp. 20–21. ISBN 955-24-0019-8.
- Rhys Davids, Thomas William; Stede, William Stede, eds. (1921). Pali–English Dictionary. Chipstead: Pali Text Society. A general online search engine for this dictionary is available at dsal.uchicago.edu/dictionaries/pali/.
- Sujato, Bhante (trans.) (2015). Numbered Discourses. SuttaCentral.
- Thanissaro (trans.) (1997a). Mahanama Sutta: To Mahanama (1) (Anguttara Nikaya 11.12). Available online at www.accesstoinsight.org/tipitaka/an/an11/an11.012.than.html.
- Thanissaro (trans.) (1997b). Muluposatha Sutta: The Roots of the Uposatha (Anguttara Nikaya 3.70). Available online at www.accesstoinsight.org/tipitaka/an/an03/an03.070.than.html.
- Thanissaro (trans.) (1998). Lohicca Sutta: To Lohicca (Digha Nikaya 12). Available online at www.accesstoinsight.org/tipitaka/dn/dn.12.0.than.html.
- Thanissaro (trans.) (2002). Tekicchakani (Theragatha 6.2). Available online at www.accesstoinsight.org/tipitaka/kn/thag/thag.06.02.than.html.
