= Ānāpānasati Sutta =

Buddhist scripture in Pali Canon

The Ānāpānasati Sutta (Pāli) or Ānāpānasmṛti Sūtra (Sanskrit), "Breath-Mindfulness Discourse," Majjhima Nikaya 118, is a discourse that details the Buddha's instruction on using awareness of the breath (anapana) as an initial focus for meditation.

The sutta includes sixteen steps of practice, and groups them into four tetrads, associating them with the four satipatthanas (placings of mindfulness). According to American scholar monk, Thanissaro Bhikkhu, this sutta contains the most detailed meditation instructions in the Pali Canon.

== Versions of the text ==
=== Theravāda Pāli Canon ===
The Theravada Pali Canon version of the Ānāpānasati Sutta lists sixteen steps to compose the mind and body and cultivate insight. The Ānāpānasati Sutta is a celebrated text among Theravada Buddhists. In the Theravada Pāli Canon, this discourse is the 118th discourse in the Majjhima Nikāya (MN) and is thus frequently represented as "MN 118". In addition, in the Pali Text Society edition of the Pali Canon, this discourse is in the Majjhima Nikaya (M)'s third volume, starting on the 78th page and is thus sometimes referenced as "M iii 78".

=== Summary of the Pāli Canon version ===
==== Benefits ====
The Buddha states that mindfulness of the breath, "developed and repeatedly practiced, is of great fruit, great benefit." It fulfills the Four Foundations of Mindfulness (satipatthana). When these are developed and cultivated, they fulfill the Seven Factors of Enlightenment (bojjhanga). And when these are developed and cultivated, they fulfill "knowledge and freedom" (Bhikkhu Sujato), "true knowledge and deliverance" (Bhikkhu Bodhi), or "clear vision and deliverance" (Nanamoli).

==== Establishing mindfulness ====
To develop and cultivate mindfulness of breathing, a monk goes to the wilderness or forest, or to the root of a tree, or to an empty hut, sits down with crossed legs and the body erect, and establishes mindfulness in front or right there (parimukham), (Note: Analayo 2006, p. 123-124 notes that "in front" can be taken literal, or figuratively. Mukha may refer to "mouth" and "face," but also to "front" and "top." More literally, according to Anayola, it refers to focusing on the nostril area to pay attention to the breath. More figuratively, "in front" refers to sati (mindfulness) being ahead of meditative composure and attention. While the Abidhamma takes it literal, in the Suttas a more figurative meaning prevails, as when mindfulness precedes overcoming the five hindrances or developing the divine abodes. (Not mentioned by Analoya is right effort, which is also aided by mindfulness.)) and mindfully breathes in and out. (Note: The preparatory and core instructions are also detailed in the "Arittha Sutta" ("To Arittha," SN 44.6). The Chinese version of this sutta, SA 8.10, includes these instructions as part of the first object, and begins with "he trains" in the first step.)

==== Four tetrads ====
The Ānāpānasati Sutta then describes the monitoring of the breath, and relates this to various experiences and practices. Following the classification of the four satipatthanas, these experiences and practices are grouped into a list of sixteen objects or steps of instructions, generally broken into four tetrads. (Note: The basis for mapping each of the tetrads to one of the four satipatthana is that, in the Anapanasati Sutta, after what is here identified as the "core instructions," the Buddha explicitly identifies each tetrad as related to a particular satipatthana.) These core sixteen steps appear in various Pali suttas collected in the Ānāpāna-saṃyutta. They also appear in various Chinese translations of the Agamas (such as in a parallel version of the Ananada sutta in the Samyukta-Āgama, SA 8.10) with minor differences as well as in the Vinayas of different schools. They are as follows: (Note: See also Thanissaro 2006a, Nanamoli 1998)

1. First Tetrad: Contemplation of the Body (kāya)
  1. Breathing in long he knows (pajanati) 'I am breathing in long.'
    Breathing in short he knows 'I am breathing in short.'
  2. Breathing out long he knows 'I am breathing out long.'
    Breathing out short he knows 'I am breathing out short.' (Note: Ekottarika Agama 17.1 version adds "warm" and "cool" breaths.)
  3. He trains himself 'breathing in, I experience the whole body' (sabbakāya). (Note: The meaning of "whole body" is disputed. It may refer to the full breath, or to the physical body. Regarding the physical body, note the following description: "Just as though there were a bag with an opening at both ends full of many sorts of grain… so too, a bhikkhu reviews this same body as full of many kinds of impurity… (MN 10, MN 119, DN 22, Thag 19.1 verse 1134)." Some Samyukta-Agama sutras meanwhile have "bodily-formations" in this step.)
    'breathing out, I experience the whole body.'
  4. He trains himself, 'breathing in, I calm the bodily formation.'
    'breathing out, I calm the bodily formation.' (kāya-saṃskāra)
2. Second Tetrad: Contemplation of the Feeling (vedanā)
  1. He trains himself, 'I will breathe in experiencing joy.'(pīti, also translated as "rapture")
    He trains himself, 'I will breathe out experiencing joy.'
  2. He trains himself, 'I will breathe in experiencing pleasure.' (sukha).
    He trains himself, 'I will breathe out experiencing pleasure.'
  3. He trains himself, 'I will breathe in experiencing mental formation.' (citta-saṃskāra)
    He trains himself, 'I will breathe out experiencing mental formation.'
  4. He trains himself, 'I will breathe in calming the mental formation.'
    He trains himself, 'I will breathe out calming the mental formation.'
3. Third Tetrad: Contemplation of the Mind (citta)
  1. He trains himself, 'I will breathe in experiencing the mind.'
    He trains himself, 'I will breathe out experiencing the mind.'
  2. He trains himself, 'I will breathe in pleasing the mind.'
    He trains himself, 'I will breathe out pleasing the mind.'
  3. He trains himself, 'I will breathe in concentrating (samādhi) the mind.'
    He trains himself, 'I will breathe out concentrating the mind.'
  4. He trains himself, 'I will breathe in releasing the mind.'
    He trains himself, 'I will breathe out releasing the mind.'
4. Fourth Tetrad: Contemplation of the Mental Objects (dhammā)
  1. He trains himself, 'I will breathe in observing (anupassi) impermanence.' (anicca)
    He trains himself, 'I will breath out observing impermanence.'
  2. He trains himself, 'I will breathe in observing dispassion.' (virāga) (Note: SA 8.10 instead has 'eradication'.)
    He trains himself, 'I will breath out observing dispassion.
  3. He trains himself, 'I will breathe in observing cessation.' (nirodha) (Note: SA 8.10 instead has 'dispassion'.)
    He trains himself, 'I will breath out observing cessation.'
  4. He trains himself, 'I will breathe in observing relinquishment.' (paṭinissaggā) (Note: SA 8.10 instead has 'cessation'.)
    He trains himself, 'I will breath out observing relinquishment.'

==== Seven factors of awakening ====
The sutra then explains how the four tetrads are correlated to the four satipatthanas. Next, the sutra explicates how contemplation of the four satipatthanas (Note: Bronkhorst (1985), Dharma and Abhidharma, p.312-314, and Sujato (2006), A history of mindfulness: how insight worsted tranquility in the Satipatthana Sutta, p.264-273, have argued that the 'urtext' of the Satipatthana Sutta only contained the observation of the impure body parts and the observation of the seven awakening factors.) sets in the seven factors of awakening, which bring "clear knowing" and release.

=== In East Asian Buddhism ===
The Ānāpānasmṛti Sūtra, as the text was known to Sanskritic early Buddhist schools in India, exists in several forms. There is a version of the Ānāpānasmṛti Sutra in the Ekottara Āgama preserved in the Chinese Buddhist canon. This version also teaches about the Four Dhyānas, recalling past lives, and the Divine Eye. The earliest translation of Ānāpānasmṛti instructions, however, was by An Shigao as a separate sutra (T602) in the 2nd century CE. It is not part of the Sarvastivada Madhyama Āgama, but is instead an isolated text, although the sixteen steps are found elsewhere in the Madhyama and Samyukta Āgamas. The versions preserved in the Samyukta Agama are SA 815, SA 803, SA 810–812 and these three sutras have been translated into English by Thich Nhat Hanh and Bhikkhu Anālayo.

== Related canonical discourses ==
Breath mindfulness, in general, and this discourse's core instructions, in particular, can be found throughout the Pali Canon, including in the "Code of Ethics" (that is, in the Vinaya Pitaka's Parajika) as well as in each of the "Discourse Basket" (Sutta Pitaka) collections (nikaya). From these other texts, clarifying metaphors, instructional elaborations and contextual information can be gleaned. These can also be found throughout the Chinese Agamas.

=== Pali suttas including the core instructions ===
In addition to being in the Anapanasati Sutta, all four of the aforementioned core instructional tetrads can also be found in the following canonical discourses:

- the "Greater Exhortation to Rahula Discourse" (Maha-Rahulovada Sutta, MN 62);
- sixteen discourses of the Samyutta Nikaya's (SN) chapter 54 (Anapana-samyutta): SN 54.1, SN 54.3–SN 54.16, SN 54.20;
- the "To Girimananda Discourse" (Girimananda Sutta, AN 10.60); and,
- the Khuddaka Nikaya's Patisambhidamagga's section on the breath, Anapanakatha.

The first tetrad identified above (relating to bodily mindfulness) can also be found in the following discourses:

- the "Great Mindfulness Arousing Discourse" (Mahasatipatthana Sutta, DN 22) and, similarly, the "Mindfulness Arousing Discourse" (Satipatthana Sutta, MN 10), in the section on Body Contemplation; and,
- the "Mindfulness concerning the Body Discourse" (Kayagatasati Sutta, MN 119) as the first type of body-centered meditation described.

=== Chinese sutras with the core steps ===
The Saṃyukta Āgama contains a section titled Ānāpānasmṛti Saṃyukta (安那般那念相應) which contains various sutras on the theme of anapanasati including the sixteen steps.

=== Metaphors ===
==== Hot-season rain cloud ====
In a discourse variously entitled "At Vesali Discourse" and "Foulness Discourse" (SN 54.9), the Buddha describes "concentration by mindfulness of breathing" (ānāpānassatisamādhi) in the following manner:

"Just as, bhikkhus, in the last month of the hot season, when a mass of dust and dirt has swirled up, a great rain cloud out of season disperses it and quells it on the spot, so too concentration by mindfulness of breathing, when developed and cultivated, is peaceful and sublime, an ambrosial pleasant dwelling, and it disperses and quells on the spot evil unwholesome states whenever they arise..."

After stating this, the Buddha states that such an "ambrosial pleasant dwelling" is achieved by pursuing the sixteen core instructions identified famously in the Anapanasati Sutta.

==== The skillful turner ====
In the "Great Mindfulness Arousing Discourse" (Mahasatipatthana Sutta, DN 22) and the "Mindfulness Arousing Discourse" (Satipatthana Sutta, MN 10), the Buddha uses the following metaphor for elaborating upon the first two core instructions:

Just as a skillful turner or turner's apprentice, making a long turn, knows, "I am making a long turn," or making a short turn, knows, "I am making a short turn," just so the monk, breathing in a long breath, knows, "I am breathing in a long breath"; breathing out a long breath, he knows, "I am breathing out a long breath"; breathing in a short breath, he knows, "I am breathing in a short breath"; breathing out a short breath, he knows, "I am breathing out a short breath."

=== Expanded contexts ===
==== Great fruit, great benefit ====
The Anapanasati Sutta refers to sixteenfold breath-mindfulness as being of "great fruit" (mahapphalo) and "great benefit" (mahānisaṃso). "The Simile of the Lamp Discourse" (SN 54.8) states this as well and expands on the various fruits and benefits, including:

- unlike with other meditation subjects, with the breath one's body and eyes do not tire and one's mind, through non-clinging, becomes free of taints
- householder memories and aspirations are abandoned
- one dwells with equanimity towards repulsive and unrepulsive objects
- one enters and dwells in the four material absorptions (rupajhana) and the four immaterial absorptions (arupajhana)
- all feelings (vedana) are seen as impermanent, are detached from and, upon the death of the body, "will become cool right here."

== Commentaries and interpretations ==
=== Traditional commentaries ===
==== Pali commentaries ====
In traditional Pali literature, the 5th-century CE commentary (atthakatha) for this discourse can be found in two works, both attributed to Ven. Buddhaghosa:

- the Visuddhimagga provides commentary on the four tetrads, focusing on "concentration through mindfulness of breathing" (ānāpānassati-samādhi).
- the Papañcasūdanī provides commentary on the remainder of this discourse.

The earlier Vimuttimagga also provides a commentary on Anapanasati, as does the late canonical Pali Paṭisambhidāmagga (ca. 2nd c. BCE).

Likewise, the sub-commentary to the Visuddhimagga, Paramatthamañjusā (ca. 12th c. BCE), provides additional elaborations related to Buddhaghosa's treatment of this discourse. For instance, the Paramatthamañjusā maintains that a distinction between Buddhists and non-Buddhists is that Buddhists alone practice the latter twelve instructions (or "modes") described in this sutta: "When outsiders know mindfulness of breathing, they only know the first four modes [instructions]" (Pm. 257, trans. Ñāṇamoli).

==== Sanskrit commentaries ====
The Śrāvakabhūmi chapter of the Yogācārabhūmi-śāstra and Vasubandhu's Abhidharmakośa both contain expositions on the practice outlined in the Ānāpānasmṛti Sūtra.

==== Chinese commentaries ====
The Chinese Buddhist monk An Shigao translated a version of the Ānāpānasmṛti Sūtra into Chinese (148-170 CE) known as the Anban shouyi jing (安般守意經, Scripture on the ānāpānasmŗti) as well as other works dealing with Anapanasati. The practice was a central feature of his teaching and that of his students who wrote various commentaries on the sutra.

One work which survives from the tradition of An Shigao is the Da anban shouyi jing (佛說大安般守意經, Taishō Tripitaka No.602) which seems to include the translated sutra of anapanasmrti as well as original added commentary amalgamated within the translation.

=== Modern interpretations ===
Different traditions (such as Sri Lankan practitioners who follow the Visuddhimagga versus Thai forest monks) interpret a number of aspects of this sutta in different ways. Below are some of the matters that have multiple interpretations:

- Are the 16 core instructions to be followed sequentially or concurrently (Bodhi, 2000, p. 1516; Brahm, 2006, pp. 83–101; Rosenberg, 2004)?
- Must one have reached the first jhana before (or in tandem with) pursuing the second tetrad (Rosenberg, 2004)?
- In the preparatory instructions, does the word "parimukham" mean: around the mouth (as favored by Goenka, 1998, p. 28), in the chest area (as supported by a use of the word in the Vinaya), in the forefront of one's mind (as favored at times by Thanissaro) or simply "sets up mindfulness before him" (per Bodhi in Wallace & Bodhi, 2006, p. 5) or "to the fore" (Thanissaro, 2006d) or "mindfulness alive" (Piyadassi, 1999) ?
- In the first tetrad's third instruction, does the word "sabbakaya" mean: the whole "breath body" (as indicated in the sutta itself [Nanamoli, 1998, p. 7: "I say that this, bhikkhus, is a certain body among the bodies, namely, respiration."], as perhaps supported by the Patisambhidamagga [Nanamoli, 1998, p. 75], the Visuddhimagga [1991, pp. 266–267], Nyanaponika [1965, pp. 109–110], Buddhadasa [1988, p. 35], and Brahm [2006, p. 84]) or the whole "flesh body" (as supported by Bhikkhu Bodhi's revised second translation of the sutta [in Nanamoli & Bodhi, 2001, see relevant footnote to MN 118], Goenka [1988, pp. 29–30], Nhat Hanh [1988, p. 26] and Rosenberg [1998, pp. 40, 43]), and the commentary, which explains that the "body among bodies" refers to the wind element as opposed to other ways of relating to the body?

== Modern expositions available in English ==
- Nhất Hạnh, Thích (2008). Breathe, You Are Alive: The Sutra on the Full Awareness of Breathing. Parallax Press. ISBN 978-1888375848.
- Rosenberg, Larry (2004). Breath by Breath: The Liberating Practice of Insight Meditation. Shambhala Publications. ISBN 978-1590301364.
- Bhikkhu Anālayo (2019). Mindfulness of Breathing: A Practice Guide and Translations, Cambridge: Windhorse,
- Mindfulness of Breathing (Ánápánasati) (PDF). Translated by Bhikkhu, Ñánamoli. Kandy, Sri Lanka: Buddhist Publication Society. 2000. ISBN 9789552401671.
- Analayo. Understanding and Practicing the Ānāpānasati-sutta in "Buddhist Foundations of Mindfulness" (Mindfulness in Behavioral Health) 1st ed. 2015 Edition
- Buddhadasa. Santikaro Bhikkhu (Translator). Mindfulness with Breathing: A Manual for Serious Beginners. Wisdom Publications; Revised edition (June 15, 1988). ISBN 9780861717163.
- Bhaddanta Āciṇṇa. Mindfulness of Breathing (Anapanasati)
- Bhante Vimalaramsi.Breath of Love: A Guide to Mindfulness of Breathing and Loving-Kindness
- Thanissaro Bhikkhu. Right Mindfulness: Memory & Ardency on the Buddhist Path. 2012.
- U. Dhammajīva Thero. Towards an Inner Peace
- Upul Nishantha Gamage.Coming Alive with Mindfulness of Breathing
- Ajahn Kukrit Sotthibalo. Buddhawajana Anapanasati

== See also ==
- Anapanasati (Breath Mindfulness)
- Metta Sutta
- Kāyagatāsati Sutta
- Satipatthana Sutta, also called the Four Satipatthanas
- Upajjhatthana Sutta
- Bhāvanā
- Bojjhanga (Seven Factors of Enlightenment)
- Brahmavihara
- Buddhist Meditation
- Mindful yoga
- Paṭisambhidāmagga
- Satipatthana (Four Foundations of Mindfulness)
- Samatha & Vipassanā

== Sources ==
- Analayo (2006), Satipatthana. The Direct Path to Realization, Buddhist Wisdom Center
- Analayo (2007), "Mindfulness of Breathing in the Samyukta-agama", Buddhist Studies Review, 24 (2): 137–50, doi:10.1558/bsrv.v24i2.137
- Bodhi, Bhikkhu (trans.) (2000). The Connected Discourses of the Buddha: A Translation of the Saṃyutta Nikāya. Boston: Wisdom Publications. ISBN 0-86171-331-1.
- Brahm, Ajahn (2006). Mindfulness, Bliss, and Beyond. Boston: Wisdom Publications. ISBN 0-86171-275-7.
- Buddhadasa Bhikkhu (trans. by Santikaro Bhikkhu) (1988). Mindfulness with Breathing: A Manual for Serious Beginners. Boston: Shambhala Publications. ISBN 0-86171-111-4.
- Buddhaghosa, Bhadantācariya (trans. from Pāli by Bhikkhu Ñāṇamoli) (1999). The Path of Purification: Visuddhimagga. Seattle, WA: BPS Pariyatti Editions. ISBN 1-928706-00-2.
- Bullitt, John T. (2005). Uposatha Observance Days. Retrieved 2007-11-06 from "Access to Insight" at http://www.accesstoinsight.org/ptf/dhamma/sila/uposatha.html.
- Fronsdal, Gil (n.d.), The Discourse on MIndfulness of Breathing. Ānāpānasati Sutta (Majjhima Nīkāya 118) (PDF)
- Goenka, S.N. (1988). Satipatthana Sutta Discourses: Talks from a Course in Maha-Satipatthana Sutta. Seattle, WA: Vipassana Research Institute. ISBN 0-9649484-2-7.
- Kuan, Tse-fu (2008), Mindfulness in Early Buddhism: New Approaches through Psychology and Textual Analysis of Pāli, Chinese and Sanskrit Sources, Routledge, ISBN 978-0-415-43737-0
- Nanamoli, Bhikkhu (1998), Mindfulness of Breathing (Anapanasati): Buddhist Texts from the Pali Canon and Extracts from the Pali Commentaries, Kandy, Sri Lanka: Buddhist Publication Society, ISBN 955-24-0167-4
- Nanamoli, Bhikkhu (2001), Bodhi, Bhikkhu (ed.), The Middle-Length Discourses of the Buddha: A Translation of the Majjhima Nikāya, Boston: Wisdom Publications, ISBN 0-86171-072-X
- Nhat Hanh, Thich (trans. by Annabel Laity) (1988). The Sutra on the Full Awareness of Breathing. Berkeley, CA: Parallax Press. ISBN 0-938077-04-X.
- Nyanaponika Thera (1965). The Heart of Buddhist Meditation: A Handbook of Mental Training based on the Buddha's Way of Mindfulness. York Beach, ME: Samuel Weiser. ISBN 0-87728-073-8.
- Nyanasatta Thera (trans.) (1993/1994). The Foundations of Mindfulness (MN 10). Kandy, Sri Lanka: BPS (1993). Retrieved 2007-11-07 from "Access to Insight" (1994) at http://www.accesstoinsight.org/tipitaka/mn/mn.010.nysa.html.
- Piyadassi Thera (trans.) (1999). Girimananda Sutta: Discourse to Girimananda Thera (AN 10.60). Kandy, Sri Lanka: BPS. Retrieved 2007-11-06 from "Access to Insight" at http://www.accesstoinsight.org/tipitaka/an/an10/an10.060.piya.html.
- Rhys Davids, T.W. & William Stede (eds.) (1921-5). The Pali Text Society's Pali–English Dictionary. Chipstead: Pali Text Society. A general on-line search engine for the PED is available at http://dsal.uchicago.edu/dictionaries/pali/.
- Rosenberg, Larry (2004). Breath by Breath: The Liberating Practice of Insight Meditation. Shambhala. ISBN 1-59030-136-6.
- Sri Lanka Tripitaka Project (SLTP) (n.d.). Anapanasatisuttam (MN 118). Retrieved 2007-11-06 from "MettaNet" at https://web.archive.org/web/20160322191339/http://metta.lk/tipitaka/2Sutta-Pitaka/2Majjhima-Nikaya/Majjhima3/118-anappanasati-p.html.
- Sujato, Bhante (2012), A History of Mindfulness (PDF), Santipada, ISBN 9781921842108
- Thanissaro Bhikkhu (trans.) (1995). Ananda Sutta: To Ananda (On Mindfulness of Breathing) (SN 54.13). Retrieved 2007-11-06 from "Access to Insight" at http://www.accesstoinsight.org/tipitaka/sn/sn54/sn54.013.than.html.
- Thanissaro Bhikkhu (trans.) (1997). Kayagata-sati Sutta: Mindfulness Immersed in the Body (MN 119). Retrieved 2007-11-06 from "Access to Insight" at http://www.accesstoinsight.org/tipitaka/mn/mn.119.than.html.
- Thanissaro Bhikkhu (trans.) (2000). Maha-satipatthana Sutta: The Great Frames of Reference (DN 22). Retrieved from "Access to Insight" at http://www.accesstoinsight.org/tipitaka/dn/dn.22.0.than.html.
- Thanissaro, Bhikkhu (2006a), Anapanasati Sutta: Mindfulness of Breathing (MN 118)
- Thanissaro Bhikkhu (trans.) (2006b). Arittha Sutta: To Arittha (On Mindfulness of Breathing) (SN 54.6). Retrieved 2007-11-06 from "Access to Insight" at http://www.accesstoinsight.org/tipitaka/sn/sn54/sn54.006.than.html.
- Thanissaro Bhikkhu (trans.) (2006c). Dipa Sutta: The Lamp (SN 54.8). Retrieved 2007-11-06 from "Access to Insight" at http://www.accesstoinsight.org/tipitaka/sn/sn54/sn54.008.than.html.
- Thanissaro Bhikkhu (trans.) (2006d). Maha-Rahulovada Sutta: The Greater Exhortation to Rahula (MN 62). Retrieved 2007-11-06 from "Access to Insight" at http://www.accesstoinsight.org/tipitaka/mn/mn.062.than.html.
- Wallace, B. Alan and Bhikkhu Bodhi (Winter 2006). The Nature of Mindfulness and its Role in Buddhist Meditation: A Correspondence between B. Alan Wallace and the Venerable Bhikkhu Bodhi.
- Wallis, Glenn (2005). "Present-moment Awareness with Breathing" and "How to Meditate," a translation of and commentary on the Anapanasati Sutta; in: Basic Teachings of the Buddha (New York: Random House, Modern Library, 2007). ISBN 978-0-8129-7523-9.
