= Vipassanā-ñāṇa =

Stages of Buddhist Vipassanā meditation

The Vipassanā-ñāṇas (Pali, Sinhala: Vidarshana-jñāna) or insight knowledges are various stages that a practitioner of Buddhist Vipassanā ("insight", "clear-seeing") meditation is said to pass through on the way to nibbana. This "progress of insight" (Visuddhiñana-katha) is outlined in various traditional Theravada Buddhist commentary texts such as the Patisambhidamagga, the Vimuttimagga and the Visuddhimagga. In Sarvastivadin abhidharma texts, the "path of insight" (darśana-mārga) one of the five paths of progress in the dharma and is made up of several jñānas also called "thought moments". A detailed modern Abhidhamma exposition of the stages of vipassanā-ñāṇa is given by Sujin Boriharnwanaket (translated by Nina van Gorkom).

== Vimuttimagga ==
The Vimuttimagga (Path to liberation, 解脫道論) is an early meditation manual by the arahant Upatissa preserved only in a sixth-century Chinese translation. The stages of insight outlined by the Vimuttimagga are:

1. Comprehension (廣觀)
2. Rise and fall (起滅)
3. Dissolution (滅)
4. Fear & disadvantage & disenchantment (畏 & 過患 & 厭離)
5. Delight in deliverance & equanimity (樂解脫 & 捨)
6. Conformity (相似)

A similar presentation of these stages can be found in the Patisambhidamagga (dated between the 3rd century BCE to the 2nd century CE), an Abhidhamma work included in the fifth Nikāya of the Pāli Canon. In the Patisambhidamagga, there are only 5 stages presented. The first three stages are the same and the last two are "fear & disadvantage" (bhaya & ādīnava) and "wish for deliverance & equanimity towards formations" (muñcitukamyatā & saṅkhārupekkhā).

== Visuddhimagga ==
Buddhagosa's Visuddhimagga (Path of purification) (ca. 430 CE), while seemingly influenced by the Vimuttimagga, divides the insight knowledges further into sixteen stages:

1. Namarupa pariccheda ñana - Knowledge of mental and physical states, analytical knowledge of body and mind.
2. Paccaya pariggaha ñana - Discerning Conditionality, knowledge of cause and effect between mental and physical states.
3. Sammasana ñana - Knowledge of the three characteristics of mental and physical processes.
4. Udayabbaya ñana - Knowledge of arising and passing away. Accompanied by possible mental images/lights, rapture, happiness, tranquility and strong mindfulness so that "there is no body-and-mind process in which mindfulness fails to engage."
5. Bhanga ñana - Knowledge of the dissolution of formations, only the "vanishing," or "passing away" is discernible.
6. Bhaya ñana - Knowledge of the fearful nature of mental and physical states. The meditator's mind "is gripped by fear and seems helpless."
7. Adinava ñana - Knowledge of mental and physical states as dukkha. "So he sees, at that time, only suffering, only unsatisfactoriness, only misery."
8. Nibbida ñana - Knowledge of disenchantment/disgust with conditioned states.
9. Muncitukamayata ñana - Knowledge of Desire for Deliverance, the desire to abandon the worldly state (for nibbana) arises.
10. Patisankha ñana - Knowledge of re-investigation of the path. This instills a decision to practice further.
11. Sankharupekha ñana - Knowledge which regards mental and physical states with equanimity.
12. Anuloma ñana - Knowledge in conformity with the Four Noble Truths.
13. Gotrabhu ñana- Knowledge which is void of conditioned formations, "maturity Knowledge".
14. Magga ñana - Knowledge by which defilements are abandoned and are overcome by destruction.
15. Phala ñana - Knowledge which realizes the fruit of the path (nibbana).
16. Paccavekkhana ñana - Knowledge which reviews the defilements still remaining.

== Abhidhammattha-sangaha ==
In the Abhidhammattha-sangaha (11th to 12th century), another widely used Buddhist commentarial text, there are only ten insight knowledges.

1. Comprehension - sammasana
2. Rise and fall - udayabbaya
3. Dissolution - bhaṅga
4. Fear - bhaya
5. Disadvantage - ādīnava
6. Disenchantment - nibbidā
7. Wish for deliverance - muñcitukamyatā
8. Reflection - paṭisaṅkhā
9. Equanimity towards formations - saṅkhārupekkhā
10. Conformity - anuloma

== Sarvastivadin Abhidharma texts ==
The Abhidharma Mahāvibhāṣa Śāstra presents 'the process of the direct insight into the four truths' as follows:

Darśana mārga (15 moments)(見道十五心)

1. duḥkhe dharmajñānakṣānti(苦法智忍) - Receptivity to the dharma-knowledge with regard to unsatisfactoriness
2. duḥkhe dharmajñāna(苦法智)- Dharma-knowledge with regard to unsatisfactoriness
3. duḥkhe anvayajñānakṣānti(苦類智忍)- Receptivity to the dharma-knowledge with regard to unsatisfactoriness pertaining to the two upper spheres of existence
4. duḥkhe anvayajñāna(苦類智)- Dharma-knowledge with regard to unsatisfactoriness pertaining to the two upper spheres of existence
5. samudaye dharmajñānakṣānti(集法智忍)- Receptivity to the dharma-knowledge of the origin of unsatisfactoriness
6. samudaye dharmajñāna(集法智)- Dharma-knowledge of the origin of unsatisfactoriness
7. samudaye anvayajñānakṣānti(集類智忍)- Receptivity to the dharma-knowledge of the origin of unsatisfactoriness pertaining to the two upper spheres of existence
8. samudaye anvayajñāna(集類智)- Dharma-knowledge of the origin of unsatisfactoriness pertaining to the two upper spheres of existence
9. duḥkhanirodhe dharmajñānakṣānti(滅法智忍)Receptivity to the dharma-knowledge of the cessation of unsatisfactoriness
10. duḥkhanirodhe dharmajñāna(滅法智) Dharma-knowledge of the cessation of unsatisfactoriness
11. duḥkhanirodhe anvayajñānakṣānti(滅類智忍)Receptivity to the dharma-knowledge of the cessation of pertaining to the two upper spheres of existence unsatisfactoriness
12. duḥkhanirodhe anvayajñāna(滅類智)dharma-knowledge of the cessation of unsatisfactoriness pertaining to the two upper spheres of existence
13. duḥkhapratipakṣamārge dharmajñānakṣānti(道法智忍)- Receptivity dharma-knowledge of the path for the ending of unsatisfactoriness
14. duḥkhapratipakṣamārge dharmajñāna(道法智)- Dharma-knowledge of the path for the ending of unsatisfactoriness
15. duḥkhapratipakṣamārge anvayajñānakṣānti(道類智忍)- Receptivity dharma-knowledge of the path for the ending of unsatisfactoriness pertaining to the two upper spheres of existence

Bhāvanā-mārga (The 16th moment)(修道第十六心)

16. duḥkhapratipakṣamārge anvayajñāna(道類智) - Dharma-knowledge of the path for the ending of unsatisfactoriness pertaining to the two upper spheres of existence

== Abhidharma-kosa ==
The Abhidharma-kosa of Vasubandhu (4th or 5th century CE) lists the knowledges attained on the path of liberation according to the Sarvastivadin abhidharma:

1. Saṃvṛti-jñāna (世俗智): worldly, conventional knowledge ('bears on all')
2. Dharma-jñāna (法智): a knowledge of dharmas ("has for its object, the suffering etc. of Kamadhatu")
3. Anvaya-jñāna (類智): inferential knowledge ("bears on suffering, etc. of the higher spheres")
4. Duḥkha-jñāna (苦智): the knowledge of Suffering (1st Noble Truth)
5. samudaya-jñāna (集智): the knowledge of Origin (2nd Noble Truth)
6. nirodha-jñāna (滅智): the knowledge of Cessation or Extinction (3rd Noble Truth)
7. mārga-jñāna (道智): the knowledge of the Path (4th Noble Truth)
8. para-mano-jñāna (or para-citta- jñāna) (他心智): the knowledge of the mind of another (has for its sphere an independent object" one mental factor of another‘s mind)
9. kṣaya-jñāna (盡智): the Knowledge of Destruction ("with regard to the truths, the certitude that they are known, abandoned, etc.")
10. anutpāda-jñāna (無生智): the Knowledge of Non-Arising ("is the certitude that they [the truths] are no longer to be known, to be abandoned, etc.")
