= Mahābhūta =

Fundamental elements in Indian philosophy

Mahābhūta is Sanskrit for "great element". However, very few scholars define the five mahābhūtas in a broader sense as the five fundamental aspects of physical reality.

== Hinduism ==
In Hinduism's sacred literature, the "great" elements (mahābhūta) are fivefold: aether, air, fire, water and earth. See also the Samkhya Karika of Ishvara Krishna, verse 22.

For instance, the Taittirīya Upaniṣad describes the five "sheaths" of a person (Sanskrit: puruṣa), starting with the grossest level of the five evolving great elements:

From this very self did aether come into being; from aether, air; from air, fire; from fire, water, from water, the earth; from the earth, organisms; from organisms, foods; and from foods, people. Different from and lying within this people formed from the essence of foods is the self consisting of lifebreath. Different from and lying within this self consisting of breath is the self consisting of mind. Different from and lying within this self consisting of mind is the self consisting of perception. Different from and lying within this self consisting of perception is the self consisting of bliss.

In the Śvetāśvatara Upaniṣad, the deities is identified as the source of the great elements:

Some wise people say it is inherent nature, while others say it is time – all totally deluded. It is rather the greatness of deities present in the world by means of which this wheel of brahman goes around. Whom always encompass this whole world – the knowers, the architects of time, the ones with and without qualities, and the all-knowing ones – it is at their commands that the work of creation, to be conceived of as earth, water, fire, air, and aether, unfolds itself.

The same Upanishad also mentions, "When earth, water, fire, air and aether arise, when the five attributes of the elements, mentioned in the books on yoga, become manifest then the yogi's body becomes purified by the fire of yoga and they are free from illness, old age and death." (Verse 2.12).

== Buddhism ==
In Buddhism, the four Great Elements (Pali: cattāro mahābhūtāni) are earth, water, fire and air. Mahābhūta is generally synonymous with catudhātu, which is Pāli for the "Four Elements." In this, the Four Elements are a basis for understanding that leads one through unbinding of 'Rupa' or materiality to the supreme state of pure 'Emptiness' or Nirvana.

=== Definitions ===
In the Pali Canon, the most basic elements are usually identified as four in number but, on occasion, a fifth and, to an even lesser extent, a sixth element may also be identified.

==== Four primary elements ====
In canonical texts, the four Great Elements refer to elements that are both "external" (that is, outside the body, such as a river) and "internal" (that is, of the body, such as blood). These elements are described as follows:

- Earth element (paṭhavī-dhātu)
  Earth element represents the quality of solidity or attractive forces. Any matter where attractive forces are in prominence (solid bodies) are called earth elements. Internal earth elements include head hair, body hair, nails, teeth, skin, flesh, sinews, bone, organs, intestinal material, etc.
- Water element (āpa-dhātu)
  Water element represents the quality of liquidity or relative motion. Any matter where relative motion of particles is in prominence are called water elements. Internal water elements include bile, phlegm, pus, blood, sweat, fat, tears, nasal mucus, urine, semen, etc.
- Fire element (teja-dhātu)
  Fire element represents the quality of heat or energy. Any matter where energy is in prominence are called fire elements. Internal fire elements include those bodily mechanisms that produce physical warmth, ageing, digestion, etc.
- Air (or wind) element (vāyu-dhātu)
  Air element represents the quality of expansion or repulsive forces. Any matter where repulsive forces are in prominence are called air elements. Internal air elements include air associated with the pulmonary system (for example, for breathing), the intestinal system ("winds in the belly and bowels"), etc.

Any entity that carry one or more of these qualities (attractive forces, repulsive forces, energy and relative motion) are called matter (rupa). The material world is considered to be nothing but a combination of these qualities arranged in space (akasha). The result of these qualities are the inputs to our five senses, color (varna) to the eyes, smell (gandha) to the nose, taste (rasa) to the tongue, sound (shabda) to the ears, and touch (sparsha) to the body. The matter that we perceive in our mind are just a mental interpretation of these qualities.

==== Fifth and sixth elements ====
In addition to the above four elements of underived matter, two other elements are occasionally found in the Pali Canon:

- Space element (ākāsa-dhātu)
  Internal space elements includes bodily orifices such as the ears, nostrils, mouth, anus, etc.
- Consciousness element (viññāṇa-dhātu)
  Described as "pure and bright" (parisuddhaṃ pariyodātaṃ), used to cognise the three feelings (vedana) of pleasure, pain and neither-pleasure-nor-pain, and the arising and passing of the sense contact (phassa) upon which these feelings are dependent.

According to the Abhidhamma Pitaka, the "space element" is identified as "secondary" or "derived" (upādā).

=== Sensory qualities, not substances ===
While in the Theravada tradition, as well as in the earliest texts, like the Pali Canon, rūpa (matter or form) is delineated as something external, that actually exists, in some of the later schools, like the Yogachara, or "Mind Only" school, and schools heavily influenced by this school, rupa means both materiality and sensibility—it signifies, for example, a tactile object both insofar as that object is tactile and that it can be sensed. In some of these schools, rūpa is not a materiality which can be separated or isolated from cognizance; such a non-empirical category is incongruous in the context of some schools of Mahayana and Vajrayana Buddhism. In the Yogacara view, rūpa is not a substratum or substance which has sensibility as a property. For this school, it functions as perceivable physicality and matter, or rūpa, is defined in its function; what it does, not what it is. As such, the four great elements are conceptual abstractions drawn from the sensorium. They are sensorial typologies, and are not metaphysically materialistic. From this perspective, they are not meant to give an account of matter as constitutive of external, mind-independent reality. This interpretation was hotly contested by some Madhyamaka thinkers like Chandrakirti. Many Indian philosophers of both Buddhist and non Buddhist schools also heavily criticized Yogacara thinking.

=== Soteriological uses ===
The Four Elements are used in Buddhist texts to both elucidate the concept of suffering (dukkha) and as an object of meditation. The earliest Buddhist texts explain that the four primary material elements are the sensory qualities solidity, fluidity, temperature, and mobility; their characterisation as earth, water, fire, and air, respectively, is declared an abstraction – instead of concentrating on the fact of material existence, one observes how a physical thing is sensed, felt, perceived.

==== Understanding suffering ====
The Four Elements' pertinence to the Buddhist notion of suffering comes about due to:

- The Four Elements are the primary component of "form" (rūpa).

- "Form" is first category of the "Five Aggregates" (skandhas).

- The Five Aggregates are the ultimate basis for suffering (dukkha) in the "Four Noble Truths."

Schematically, this can be represented in reverse order as:

Four Noble Truths → Suffering → Aggregates → Form → Four Elements

Thus, to deeply understand the Buddha's Four Noble Truths, it is beneficial to have an understanding of the Great Elements.

==== Meditation object ====
In the Satipatthana Sutta ("The Greater Discourse on the Foundations of Mindfulness," DN 22), in listing various bodily meditation techniques, the Buddha instructs:

"Just as a skilled butcher and an assistant, having slaughtered a cattle, are sitting at a crossroads with the carcass divided into portions, so a monk reviews this very body in terms of the elements: 'There are in this body, the earth-element, the water-element, the fire-element, the air-element, the aether-element.' So they abide contemplating body in body internally."

In the Visuddhimagga's well-known list of forty meditation objects (kammaṭṭhāna), the great elements are listed as the first four objects.

B. Alan Wallace compares the Theravada meditative practice of "attending to the emblem of consciousness" to the practice in Mahamudra and Dzogchen of "maintaining the mind upon non-conceptuality", which is also aimed at focusing on the nature of consciousness.

=== Buddhist sources ===
In the Pali Canon, the Four Elements are described in detail in the following discourses (sutta):

- Mahāhatthipadompama Sutta ("The Greater Discourse on the Simile of the Elephant's Footprints" MN 28)
- Mahārāhulovāda Sutta ("The Greater Discourse of Advice to Rahula," MN 62)
- Dhātuvibhaṅga Sutta ("The Exposition of the Elements," MN 140)

The Four Elements are also referenced in:

- Kevaddha Sutta (DN 11)
- Satipaṭṭhāna Sutta (DN 22)
- Satipaṭṭhāna Sutta (MN 10)
- Chabbisodhana Sutta (MN 112)
- Bahudhātuka Sutta (MN 115)
- Kāyagatāsati Sutta (MN 119)
- Anāthapiṇḍikovāda Sutta (MN 143)
- Catudhātu-vaggo (SN ch. 14, subch. IV), several discourses
- Saddhammappatirūpaka Sutta (SN 16.13)
- Bīja Sutta (SN 22.54)
- Āsīvisa Sutta (SN 35.197 or 35.238)
- Kiṁsukopama Sutta (SN 35.204 or 35.245)
- Dutiya-mittāmacca Sutta (SN 55.17)
- Various brief Saṁyutta Nikāya discourses entitled, "Dhātu Sutta" (SN 18.9, SN 25.9, SN 26.9, SN 27.9)
- Tittha Sutta (AN 3.61)
- Nivesaka Sutta (AN 3.75)
- Rāhula Sutta (AN 4.177)

In addition, the Visuddhimagga XI.27ff has an extensive discussion of the Four Elements.

== See also ==
- Classical element
- Dukkha
- Four Noble Truths
- Skandhas
- Panchatattva (Tantra)
- Prakrti (Hindu list of the basic elements of the universe)
- Rupa
- Samkhya (school of classical Indian philosophy, which including ether, defines Mahabhuta as 5 subtle elements)
- Tanmatras
- Gogyo Japanese Non-Substantial five Elements

== Bibliography ==
- Bodhi, Bhikkhu (trans.) (2000). The Connected Discourses of the Buddha: A Translation of the Samyutta Nikaya. Boston: Wisdom Publications. ISBN 0-86171-331-1.
- Buddhaghosa, Bhadantācariya (trans. from Pāli by Bhikkhu Ñāṇamoli) (1999). The Path of Purification: Visuddhimagga. Seattle, WA: BPS Pariyatti Editions. ISBN 1-928706-00-2.
- Hamilton, Sue (2001). Identity and Experience: The Constitution of the Human Being according to Early Buddhism. Oxford: Luzac Oriental. ISBN 1-898942-23-4.
- Monier-Williams, Monier (1899, 1964). A Sanskrit-English Dictionary (London: Oxford University Press).
- Ñāṇamoli, Bhikkhu (trans.) & Bodhi, Bhikkhu (ed.) (2001). The Middle-Length Discourses of the Buddha: A Translation of the Majjhima Nikāya. Boston: Wisdom Publications. ISBN 0-86171-072-X.
- Nyanaponika Thera (trans.) (1981). The Greater Discourse on the Elephant-Footprint Simile. Kandy, Sri Lanka: Buddhist Publication Society.
- Olivelle, Patrick (1996). Upaniṣads. Oxford: Oxford University Press. ISBN 978-0-19-283576-5.
- Rhys Davids, T.W. & William Stede (eds.) (1921–5). The Pali Text Society’s Pali–English Dictionary [PED]. Chipstead: Pali Text Society. A general on-line search engine for the PED is available from the University of Chicago's "Digital Dictionaries of South Asia" at http://dsal.uchicago.edu/dictionaries/pali/ (retrieved 2007-06-14).
- Thanissaro Bhikkhu (trans.) (1994). "SN 27.9: Dhatu Sutta – Properties" in Upakkilesa Samyutta: Defilements (SN 27.1–10). Retrieved 2008-03-17 from "Access to Insight" at http://www.accesstoinsight.org/tipitaka/sn/sn27/sn27.001-010.than.html#sn27.009.
- Thanissaro Bhikkhu (trans.) (1997a). Kayagata-sati Sutta: Mindfulness Immersed in the Body (MN 119). Retrieved 2008-03-17 from "Access to Insight" at http://www.accesstoinsight.org/tipitaka/mn/mn.119.than.html.
- Thanissaro Bhikkhu (trans.) (1997b). Kevatta (Kevaddha) Sutta: To Kevatta (DN 11). Retrieved 2008-03-17 from "Access to Insight" at http://www.accesstoinsight.org/tipitaka/dn/dn.11.0.than.html.
- Thanissaro Bhikkhu (trans.) (1997c). Dhatu-vibhanga Sutta: An Analysis of the Properties (MN 140). Retrieved 2008-03-17 from "Access to Insight" at http://www.accesstoinsight.org/tipitaka/mn/mn.140.than.html.
- Thanissaro Bhikkhu (trans.) (1998). Kimsuka Sutta: The Riddle Tree (SN 35.204). Retrieved 2008-03-17 from "Access to Insight" at http://www.accesstoinsight.org/tipitaka/sn/sn35/sn35.204.than.html.
- Thanissaro Bhikkhu (trans.) (2001). Bija Sutta: Means of Propagation (SN 22.54). Retrieved 2008-03-17 from "Access to Insight" at http://www.accesstoinsight.org/tipitaka/sn/sn22/sn22.054.than.html.
- Thanissaro Bhikkhu (trans.) (2003a). Anathapindikovada Sutta: Instructions to Anathapindika (MN 143). Retrieved 2008-03-17 from "Access to Insight" at http://www.accesstoinsight.org/tipitaka/mn/mn.143.than.html.
- Thanissaro Bhikkhu (trans.) (2003b). Maha-hatthipadopama Sutta: The Great Elephant Footprint Simile (MN 28). Retrieved 2008-01-30 from "Access to Insight" at http://www.accesstoinsight.org/tipitaka/mn/mn.028.than.html.
- Thanissaro Bhikkhu (trans.) (2004a). Asivisa Sutta: Vipers (SN 35.197). Retrieved 2008-03-17 from "Access to Insight" at http://www.accesstoinsight.org/tipitaka/sn/sn35/sn35.197.than.html.
- Thanissaro Bhikkhu (trans.) (2004b). Dhatu Sutta: Properties (SN 25.9). Retrieved 2008-03-17 from "Access to Insight" at http://www.accesstoinsight.org/tipitaka/sn/sn25/sn25.009.than.html.
- Thanissaro Bhikkhu (trans.) (2005). Saddhammapatirupaka Sutta: A Counterfeit of the True Dhamma (SN 16.13). Retrieved 2008-03-17 from "Access to Insight" at http://www.accesstoinsight.org/tipitaka/sn/sn16/sn16.013.than.html.
- Thanissaro Bhikkhu (trans.) (2006). Maha-Rahulovada Sutta: The Greater Exhortation to Rahula (MN 62). Retrieved 2008-03-17 from "Access to Insight" at http://www.accesstoinsight.org/tipitaka/mn/mn.062.than.html.
- Walshe, Maurice O'C. (trans.) (1995). The Long Discourses of the Buddha: A Translation of the Digha Nikaya. Boston: Wisdom Publications. ISBN 0-86171-103-3.
