= Paramatthamañjusā =

Buddhist literature

Paramatthamañjusā is a piece of Theravada Buddhist subcommentary literature (tīkā) by Dhammapāla on Buddhaghosa's 5th century work Visuddhimagga (English: The Path of Purification).

== See also ==
- Buddhaghosa
- Dhammapāla
- Subcommentaries, Theravada
- Visuddhimagga
