= Kāyagatāsati Sutta =

Buddhist scripture in Pali Canon

The Kāyagatāsati Sutta (Skt. Kāyasmṛti; Mindfulness Immersed in the Body, MN 119) is a Pāḷi Buddhist sutta which outlines the development of mindfulness through contemplation of the body in order to reach jhāna.

== Summary of the Pāḷi version ==
The Kāyagatāsati sutta stresses the need for constant awareness of the body's position, "When walking, the monk discerns, 'I am walking.' When standing, he discerns, 'I am standing.' When sitting, he discerns, 'I am sitting.' When lying down, he discerns, 'I am lying down.'"

The sutta also outlines the practice of "reflections on repulsiveness of the body" (paṭikkūlamanasikāra). In this practice, a meditator reflects on various parts of the body (nails, hair, bodily organs, fluids), noting their impurity. The Sutta also recommends meditation on the impermanence of the body and death by contemplating human corpses in various states of decomposition. "Furthermore, as if he were to see a corpse cast away in a charnel ground—one day, two days, three days dead—bloated, livid, & festering, he applies it to this very body, 'This body, too: Such is its nature, such is its future, such its unavoidable fate.'"

The sutta then explains the attainment of the four rūpa jhānas, states of calm concentration reached through meditation.

Finally, the sutta outlines the ten benefits of these practices, which are as follows:

1. Conquering displeasure & delight
2. Conquering fear & dread
3. Resistance to temperature, pain and the elements.
4. Attainment of the four jhānas
5. "Manifold supranormal powers" (e.g., walking on water, walking through walls)
6. Supernatural hearing
7. Psychic powers—knowing the "awareness of other beings"
8. Recollection of past lives
9. Seeing "by means of the divine eye, purified & surpassing the human"
10. "Through the ending of the mental effluents, he remains in the effluent-free awareness-release & discernment-release, having known and made them manifest for himself right in the here & now."

== Chinese Āgama version ==
There is a parallel text in the Madhyama Āgama of the Chinese Canon called Sūtra on Mindfulness of the Body, which is attributed to the Sarvastivāda school. According to Tse Fu Kuan, the list of practices in this text are:

1. "understanding the four postures and the states of being asleep [and/or] awake"
2. "full awareness of daily activities"
3. "extinguishing evil unwholesome thoughts with wholesome dharma thoughts"
4. "with teeth clenched and the tongue pressed against the palate, restraining one mental state with [another] mental state"
5. "mindfulness of breathing"
6. "the rapture and pleasure born of seclusion pervading the body (the first jhana)"
7. "the rapture and pleasure born of concentration pervading the body (the second jhana)"
8. "the pleasure born of the absence of rapture pervading the body (the third jhana)"
9. "pervading the body with the pure state of mind (the fourth jhana)"
10. "attending to the conception of light, and developing a bright mind"
11. "grasping the reviewing-sign and recollecting what he attends to"
12. "reviewing the body as full of various kinds of impurity"
13. "reviewing the body by way of the six elements"
14. "contemplating a corpse in different states of decomposition"

== See also ==
- Pāli Canon
- Sutta Piṭaka
- Majjhima Nikāya
- Metta Sutta
- Upajjhatthana Sutta
- Ānāpānasati Sutta
- Satipatthana Sutta, also called the Four Satipatthanas
- Anussati
- Anapanasati (Breath Mindfulness)
- Bojjhanga (Seven Factors of Enlightenment)
- Satipatthana (Four Foundations of Mindfulness)
- Buddhist Meditation

== Bibliography ==
- Bhikkhu Nanamoli and Bhikkhu Bodhi (trans.), The Middle Length Discourses of the Buddha: A Translation of the Majjhima Nikaya, 1995, Somerville: Wisdom Publications ISBN 0-86171-072-X.
