= Paṭisambhidāmagga =

Buddhist scripture in the Pali Canon

- SuttaCentral; OpenTipitaka
- Type: Canonical text
- Parent: Khuddaka Nikāya
- Attribution: Sāriputta; Bhāṇaka
- Aṭṭhakathā: Saddhammapakāsinī (Paṭisambhidāmagga-aṭṭhakathā)
- Commentator: Mahānāma (5th century)
- Abbreviation: Ps; Paṭis; Pṭs

Translations of Patisambhidamagga
- Pali: Patisambhidamagga
- Vietnamese: Phân tích đạo

The Patisambhidamagga (paṭisambhidā-; Pali for "path of discrimination"; sometimes called just Patisambhida for short; abbrevs.: Paṭis, Pṭs) is a Buddhist scripture, part of the Pali Canon of Theravada Buddhism. It is included there as the twelfth book of the Sutta Pitaka's Khuddaka Nikaya. Tradition ascribes it to the Buddha's disciple Sariputta. It comprises 30 chapters on different topics, of which the first, on knowledge, makes up about a third of the book.

== History ==
Tradition ascribes the Patisambhidamagga to the Buddha's great disciple, Sariputta. It bears some similarities to the Dasuttara Sutta of the Digha Nikaya, which is also attributed to Sariputta.

According to German tradition of Indology this text was likely composed around the 2nd century CE. Indications of the relative lateness of the text include numerous quotations from the Sutta and Vinaya Pitaka, as well as an assumed familiarity with a variety of Buddhist legends and stories- for example, the names of various arahants are given without any discussion of their identities. The term patisambhida does not occur in the older sutra and vinaya texts, but does appear in both the Abhidhamma and several other Khuddaka Nikaya texts regarded as relatively late. A variant form, pratisamvid, occurs in Buddhist Hybrid Sanskrit and suggests that the concept itself was shared with other, non-Theravada sects. The Patisambhidamagga is also included in the Dipavamsa in a list of texts rejected by the Mahasanghikas. On the basis of this reference and certain thematic elements, AK Warder suggested that some form of the text may date to the 3rd Century BCE, the traditional date ascribed to the schism with the Mahasanghikas. L. S. Cousins associated it with the doctrinal divisions of the Second Buddhist Council and dated it to the first century BCE.

The Patisambhidamagga has been described as an "attempt to systematize the Abhidhamma" and thus as a possible precursor to the Visuddhimagga. The text's systematic approach and the presence of a matika summarizing the contents of the first section are both features suggestive of the Abhidhamma, but it also includes some features of the Sutta Pitaka, including repeated invocation of the standard sutta opening evaṃ me suttaṃ ('thus have I heard'). Its content and aspects of its composition overlap significantly with the Vibhanga, and A.K. Warder suggested that at some stage in its development it may have been classified as an Abhidhamma text.

Noa Ronkin suggests that the Patisambhidamagga likely dates from the era of the Abhidhamma's formation, and represents a parallel development of the interpretive traditions reflected by the Vibhanga and Dhammasangani.

== Emptiness ==
The Patisambhidamagga is probably the first Pali Abhidhamma text which uses the term "sabhava" in the section titled the Suññakatha. It defines sabhava as the empty (suññam) nature of the five aggregates:

"Born materiality is empty of sabhava (sabhavena suññam); disappeared materiality is both changed and empty. Born feeling is empty of sabhava; disappeared feeling is both changed and empty...Born conceptualization...Born volitions...Born consciousness...Born becoming is empty of sabhava; disappeared becoming is both changed and empty. This is ‘empty in terms of change’."

The text also defines the sense spheres as "void (suñña) of self (atta), or of what belongs to self (attaniya); or of what is permanent (nicca), everlasting (dhuva), or eternal (sassata); or not-subject-to-change (avipariṇāma)" (…suññaṁ attena vā attaniyena vā niccena vā dhuvena vā sassatena vā avipariṇāmadhammena vā).

According to Noa Ronkin: "this extract means that the totality of human experience is devoid of an enduring substance or of anything which belongs to such a substance, because this totality is dependent on many and various conditions, and is of the nature of being subject to a continuous process of origination and dissolution."

== Overview ==
The Patisambhidamagga has three divisions (vagga) composed of ten "chapters" (kathā) each for a total of thirty chapters. The three divisions are:

- Mahāvagga ("Great Division") - starts with an enumeration (mātikā) of 73 types of knowledge (ñāṇa) which are then elaborated upon in detail.
- Yuganandhavagga ("Coupling Division") - poses a series of questions.
- Paññāvagga ("Wisdom Division") - answers the prior division's questions.

== Translations ==
The Patisambhidamagga was one of the last texts of the Pali Canon to be translated into English. Its technical language and frequent use of repetition and elision presented a challenge to translators and interpreters. A first translation by Bhikkhu Nanamoli was published posthumously, following extensive editing and reworking by AK Warder.

Translation: The Path of Discrimination, tr Nanamoli, 1982, Pali Text Society, Bristol

In addition, Mindfulness of Breathing, tr Nanamoli, 1998 (6th ed.), Buddhist Publication Society, Kandy, Sri Lanka, includes a translation of the Anapanakatha in the Patisambhidamagga, along with the Anapanasati Sutta and other material from Pali literature on the subject.

== Sources ==
- Hinüber, Oskar von (2000). A Handbook of Pāli Literature. Berlin: Walter de Gruyter. ISBN 3-11-016738-7.

== See also ==
- Nanamoli Bhikkhu
- Buddhaghosa
- Visuddhimagga
- Vimuttimagga
