= Ñāṇamoli Bhikkhu =

British Theravada Buddhist monk (1905–1960)

Personal life
- Born: Osbert John Salvin Moore; 25 June 1905 United Kingdom
- Died: 8 March 1960 (aged 54) Veheragama near Mahawa, Sri Lanka
- Occupation: Buddhist monk, Pali scholar, translator

Religious life
- Religion: Theravada

Senior posting
- Teacher: Ñāṇatiloka Maha Thera
- Based in: Island Hermitage

Ñāṇamoli Bhikkhu (born Osbert John Salvin Moore; 25 June 1905 – 8 March 1960) was a British Theravada Buddhist monk and translator of Pali literature.

== Biography ==
=== Early life ===
Born in Cambridge, Osbert was the only child of biologist John Edmund Sharrock Moore and Heloise Moore (née Salvin). He was named after Heloise's father, the naturalist Osbert Salvin. He studied modern languages at Exeter College, Oxford. He helped a friend to run an antiques shop before joining the army at the outbreak of World War II, joining the anti-aircraft regiment before being transferred to the Intelligence Corps officer-cadet training camp. He was posted to a camp on the Isle of Man to help oversee Italian internees.

In 1944, he was posted to Italy serving as an intelligence officer interrogating spies and saboteurs. During this period he discovered Buddhism via Julius Evola's The Doctrine of Awakening, a traditionalist interpretation of Buddhism. This work had been translated by his friend Harold Edward Musson (also known as Ñāṇavīra Thera), a fellow British intelligence officer serving in Italy.

=== Monk ===
After the war Moore joined the Italian section of the BBC. Moore and Musson, who shared a flat in London, were quite disillusioned with their lives and left to Sri Lanka in 1949 to become Buddhist monks. On 24 April 1949 they received the novice (samanera) ordination or going forth, pabbajjā, from Ñāṇatiloka at the Island Hermitage. In 1950 they received their bhikkhu ordination at Vajirarama Temple Colombo. Ñāṇamoli spent almost his entire monk life of eleven years at the Island Hermitage.

After having been taught the basics of Pali by Nyanatiloka Mahathera, Ñāṇamoli acquired a remarkable command of the Pali language and a wide knowledge of the canonical scriptures within a comparatively short time. He is remembered for his reliable translations from the Pali into English, mostly of abstruse texts such as the Nettippakaraṇa which are considered difficult to translate. He also wrote essays on aspects of Buddhism. By 1956 he had translated Visuddhimagga into English and got it published as The Path of Purification. He also compiled The Life of the Buddha, a reliable and popular biography of the Buddha based on authentic records in the Pali Canon. His notes with his philosophical thoughts were compiled by Nyanaponika Thera and published as A Thinker's Note Book.

His handwritten draft translation of the Majjhima Nikaya was typed out after his death and edited by Bhikkhu Khantipalo, and partly published as A Treasury of the Buddha's Discourses and then edited again by Bhikkhu Bodhi and published as Middle Length Discourse of the Buddha and published by Wisdom Publications in 1995. Other draft translations, edited and published after his death, are The Path of Discrimination (Paṭisambhidāmagga) and Dispeller of Delusion (Sammohavinodanī).

While on a pilgrimage he died suddenly due to heart failure at the hamlet of Veheragama near Mahawa. His body was brought to Vajirarama Temple in Colombo and cremated at a nearby cemetery.

== Works ==
Published by the Pali Text Society, London

- Minor Readings and Illustrator. The Khuddakapāṭha and Commentary. Transl, from the Pali. 1960.
- The Guide (Nettipakarana). Transl. from the Pali. 1962.
- Piṭaka-Disclosure (Peṭakopadesa). Transl. from the Pali. 1964.
- The Path of Discrimination (Patisambhidamagga). Transl. from the Pali, 1982.
- Dispeller of Delusion (Sammohavinodanī). Transl. from the Pali. Revised by L.S. Cousins, Nyanaponika Thera and C.M.M. Shaw, 2 volumes, 1987, 1991.

Published by the Buddhist Publication Society, Kandy

- The Path of Purification (Visuddhimagga) by Bhadantācariya Buddhaghosa. Translated from the Pali. First edition 1956. 3rd ed. 1991. Read
- Mindfulness of Breathing (Ānāpānasati): Buddhist Texts from the Pali Canon and Extracts from the Pali Commentaries. First edition 1964. Fifth edition 1991. Read
- The Life of the Buddha: as it appears in the Pali Canon, the oldest authentic record. (369 pp.) First printing 1972, fifth printing 2007. Read
- The Practice of Loving-kindness (Mettā): as taught by the Buddha in the Pali Canon. Compiled and translated 1958. Published in The Wheel No. 6/7. First printing 1958. Sixth reprint 2005. Read
- A Pali-English Glossary of Buddhist Technical Terms. Edited by Bhikkhu Bodhi. First edition 1991. Second edition 2007. Read
- Three Cardinal Discourses of the Buddha: Translation with Introduction and Notes. First printing 1960; third reprint 1981 as The Wheel No. 17. Read
- Pathways of Buddhist Thought: Four Essays (from Posthumous papers). 1963, 1983—(The Wheel No. 52/53.) Reprinted in an anthology of The Wheel publications published by George Allen & Unwin, London, 1971 under the same title). Read
- The Three Refuges. 1959. (Bodhi Leaves No. A. 5). Read
- “Anicca-Dukkha-Anatta. According to the Theravāda.” Three Essays in The Three Basic Facts of Existence (The Wheel Nos. 186/187, 191/193, 202/204), 1973–74. Read
- A Thinker’s Notebook: Posthumous Papers of a Buddhist Monk. Compiled by Nyanaponika Thera. First edition 1972 (Forest Hermitage, Kandy). Second edition: 1980. Third edition, including Pathways of Buddhist Thought (earlier published under the same title as Wheel Publication 52/53), and the previously unpublished essay 'The Sukkhavipassaka', 2008. Read

Published by Mahamakuta Rajavidyalaya Press, Bangkok

- The Pātimokkha. 227 Fundamental Rules of a Bhikkhu. Translated from the Pali. 1969.
- A Treasury of the Buddha's Discourses. Compilation of Suttas from the Majjhima Nikaya. Edited by Bhikkhu Khantipalo, 1977.

Published by Wisdom Publications, Boston

- Middle Length Length Discourses of the Buddha Translated from the Pali. Edited by Bhikkhu Bodhi. 1995, 2005, 2009. ISBN 0-86171-072-X, 9780861710720

=== Wheel Publications (BPS) ===
- Stories of Old: Gathered from the Pali Commentaries (WH059)
- Greater Discourse on Voidness: Mahasuññata Sutta with Commentary (WH087)
- Ratthapala Sutta: Discourse from the Majjhima Nikaya (WH110)
- Girimananda Sutta: Ten contemplations with commentary (WH177)
- Buddha's Words on Kamma: Four Discourses from the Majjhima Nikaya (WH248/249)
- Exposition of Non-Conflict (WH269)
- Discourse on Right View: Sammaditthi Sutta (WH377/379)
- Lion’s Roar: Two discourses of the Buddha (WH390/391)
- Buddha's Teaching in His Own Words (WH428/430)

== Bibliography ==
- The Life of Nyanatiloka: The Biography of a Western Buddhist Pioneer Bhikkhu Nyanatusita and Hellmuth Hecker, Kandy, 2009. View online.
