= Visuddhimagga =

Sri Lankan treatise on Buddhist practice

- OpenTipitaka
- Type: Compendium text
- Parent: Pāli literature
- Compendium on: Sutta Piṭaka
- Composition: c. 5th century
- Attribution: Buddhaghosa
- Abbreviation: Vism
- Related: Visuddhimaggamahāṭīkā (Paramatthamañjūsā); Visuddhimagganidānakathā

The Visuddhimagga (Pali; English: The Path of Purification; Vietnamese: Thanh tịnh đạo; Sinhala: විශුද්ධි මාර්ගය), is the 'great treatise' on Buddhist practice and Theravāda Abhidhamma written by Buddhaghosa approximately in the 5th century in Sri Lanka. It is a manual condensing and systematizing the 5th century understanding and interpretation of the Buddhist path as maintained by the elders of the Mahavihara Monastery in Anuradhapura, Sri Lanka.

It is considered the most important Theravada text outside the Tipitaka canon of scriptures, (Note: See, for instance, Kheminda Thera, in Ehara et al. 1995 p. xliii: "The Visuddhimagga is a household word in all Theravāda lands. No scholar of Buddhism, whether of Theravāda or of Mahāyāna is unacquainted with it.") and is described as "the hub of a complete and coherent method of exegesis of the Tipitaka."

== Background ==
=== Structure ===
The structure of the Visuddhimagga is based on the Ratha-vinita Sutta ("Relay Chariots Discourse," MN 24), which describes the progression from the purity of discipline to the final destination of nibbana in seven steps. (Note: See Thanissaro (1999) for a translation of the Ratha-vinita Sutta. See the various Visuddhimagga printings listed below to see the manner in which this sutta is explicitly integrated into the work.) The Visuddhimagga's material also strongly resembles the material found in an earlier treatise called the Vimuttimagga (c. 1st or 2nd century).

=== Reflecting later developments ===
The Visuddhimagga's doctrine reflects Theravada Abhidhamma scholasticism, which includes several innovations and interpretations not found in the earliest discourses (suttas) of the Buddha. Buddhaghosa's Visuddhimagga includes non-canonical instructions on Theravada meditation, such as "ways of guarding the mental image (nimitta)," which point to later developments in Theravada meditation. Other modern teachers of the Dhamma such as Mahasi Sayadaw, Sujin Boriharnwanaket and Nina van Gorkom have drawn on the Visuddhimagga and cite the ''Visuddhimagga'' extensively for definitions of mental factors and the stages of insight, explanations of metta, and so on.

=== Kasina-meditation ===
The Visuddhimagga concerns kasina-meditation, a form of concentration-meditation in which the mind is focused on a (mental) object. According to Thanissaro Bhikkhu, "[t]he text then tries to fit all other meditation methods into the mold of kasina practice, so that they too give rise to countersigns, but even by its own admission, breath meditation does not fit well into the mold." In its emphasis on kasina-meditation, the Visuddhimagga departs from the Pali Canon, in which dhyana is the central meditative practice, indicating that what "jhana means in the commentaries is something quite different from what it means in the Canon."

=== Non-Theravada influences ===
Kalupahana notes that the Visuddhimagga contains "some metaphysical speculations, such as those of the Sarvastivadins, the Sautrantikas, and even the Yogacarins". Kalupahana comments

Buddhaghosa was careful in introducing any new ideas into the Mahavihara tradition in a way that was too obvious. There seems to be no doubt that the Visuddhimagga and the commentaries are a testimony to the abilities of a great harmonizer who blended old and new ideas without arousing suspicion in the minds of those who were scrutinizing his work.

However, this remains an assertion with no evidence provided by Kalupahana

== Contents ==
=== Summary ===
The Visuddhimagga is composed of three sections, which discuss: 1) Sīla (ethics or discipline); 2) Samādhi (meditative concentration); 3) Pañña (understanding or wisdom).

- The first section (part 1) explains the rules of discipline, and the method for finding a correct temple to practice, or how to meet a good teacher.
- The second section (part 2) describes samatha practice, object by object (see Kammatthana for the list of the forty traditional objects). It mentions different stages of concentration.
- The third section (part 3-7) is a description of the five skandhas (aggregates), ayatanas, the Four Noble Truths, dependent origination (Pratitya-samutpada), and the practice of vipassana through the development of wisdom. It emphasizes different forms of knowledge emerging because of the practice. This part shows a great analytical effort specific to Buddhist philosophy.

=== Seven Stages of Purification ===
This comparison between practice and "seven relay chariots" points at the goal. Each purity is needed to attain the next. They are often referred to as the "Seven Stages of Purification" (satta-visuddhi):

1. Purification of Conduct (sīla-visuddhi)
2. Purification of Mind (citta-visuddhi)
3. Purification of View (ditthi-visuddhi)
4. Purification by Overcoming Doubt (kankha-vitarana-visuddhi)
5. Purification by Knowledge and Vision of What Is Path and Not Path (maggamagga-ñanadassana-visuddhi)
6. Purification by Knowledge and Vision of the Course of Practice (patipada-ñanadassana-visuddhi)
  1. Knowledge of contemplation of rise and fall (udayabbayanupassana-nana)
  2. Knowledge of contemplation of dissolution (bhanganupassana-nana)
  3. Knowledge of appearance as terror (bhayatupatthana-nana)
  4. Knowledge of contemplation of danger (adinavanupassana-nana)
  5. Knowledge of contemplation of dispassion (nibbidanupassana-nana)
  6. Knowledge of desire for deliverance (muncitukamyata-nana)
  7. Knowledge of contemplation of reflection (patisankhanupassana-nana)
  8. Knowledge of equanimity about formations (sankharupekka-nana)
  9. Conformity knowledge (anuloma-nana)
7. Purification by Knowledge and Vision (ñanadassana-visuddhi)
  1. Change of lineage
  2. The first path and fruit
  3. The second path and fruit
  4. The third path and fruit
  5. The fourth path and fruit

The "Purification by Knowledge and Vision" is the culmination of the practice, in four stages leading to liberation and Nirvana. The emphasis in this system is on understanding the three marks of existence, dukkha, anatta, anicca. This emphasis is recognizable in the value that is given to vipassana over samatha in the contemporary vipassana movement.

=== Siddhis ===
According to scholars, the Visuddhimagga is one of the relatively rare texts within the extensive Jain, Buddhist, and Hindu literary traditions to provide explicit descriptions of how spiritual practitioners were believed to develop and exercise supernormal abilities. The text describes abilities such as flying through the air, passing through solid obstructions, entering the ground and walking on water, which are explained in terms of transforming the perception or manifestation of one element, such as earth, into another, such as air. According to the text, mastery of kasina meditation is a prerequisite for developing such abilities. Dipa Ma, who trained in practices associated with the Visuddhimagga, was reported by her students and biographers to have demonstrated such abilities.

== Influence ==
=== Traditional Theravada ===
The Visuddhimagga is considered the most important Theravada text outside of the Tipitaka canon of scriptures, along with the Milindapañha. According to Nanamoli Bhikkhu, the Visuddhimagga is "the hub of a complete and coherent method of exegesis of the Tipitaka, using the ‘Abhidhamma method' as it is called. And it sets out detailed practical instructions for developing purification of mind."

=== Contemporary Theravada ===
The Visuddhimagga is one of the main texts on which the contemporary vipassana method (and the vipassana movement itself) is based, together with the Satipatthana Sutta. Yet, its emphasis on kasina-meditation and its claim of the possibility of "dry insight" has also been criticised and rejected by some contemporary Theravada scholars and vipassana-teachers.

According to Thanissaro Bhikkhu, "the Visuddhimagga uses a very different paradigm for concentration from what you find in the Canon." Bhante Henepola Gunaratana also notes that what "the suttas say is not the same as what the Visuddhimagga says [...] they are actually different," leading to a divergence between a [traditional] scholarly understanding and a practical understanding based on meditative experience. Gunaratana further notes that Buddhaghosa invented several key meditation terms which are not to be found in the suttas, such as "parikamma samadhi (preparatory concentration), upacara samadhi (access concentration), appanasamadhi (absorption concentration)." Gunaratana also notes that Buddhaghosa's emphasis on kasina-meditation is not to be found in the suttas, where dhyana is always combined with mindfulness. (Note: See also Bronkhorst (1993), Two Traditions of Meditation in ancient India; Wynne (2007), The Origin of Buddhist Meditation; and Polak (2011), Reexaming Jhana)

Bhikkhu Sujato has argued that certain views regarding Buddhist meditation expounded in the Visuddhimagga are a "distortion of the Suttas" since it denies the necessity of jhana. According to the Burmese scholar Venerable Pandita, the postscript to the Visuddhimagga is not by Buddhaghosa.

== Editions ==
=== Printed Pali editions ===
- Caroline A. F. Rhys Davids, Visuddhimagga Pali Text Society, London, 1920 & 1921. (Latin script)
- Warren, H. C. & Kosambi, D. D. Visuddhimagga of Buddhaghosâcariya, Harvard Oriental Series, Vol. 41, 1950.(Latin script)
- Hewavitarne Bequest edition, Colombo, Sri Lanka (Sinhala script)

=== South-East Asia ===
Sinhala

- Sinhala Visuddhimargaya, Pandita Matara Sri Dharmavamsa Sthavira, Matara, Sri Lanka, 1953 (Sinhala)

Burmese

- Hanthawaddy Press edition, Rangoon, Myanmar (Burmese script)

Thai

- Royal Siamese edition, Bangkok, Thailand (Thai script)
- คัมภีร์วิสุทธิมรรค (Khamphi Wisutthimak), Somdej Phra Buddhacarya (Ard Asabhamahathera), sixth edition. Bangkok: Mahachulalongkornrajvidyalaya University, B.E. 2548 (2005). ISBN 974-91641-5-6

=== English translations ===
- The Path of Purity, Pe Maung (trans.), Pali Text Society, London, 3 vols., 1922–31 Part 1: Of Virtue, Part 2: Of Concentration & Part 3: Of Understanding
- Bhikkhu Nyanamoli (trans.), The Path of Purification, Visuddhimagga, Buddhist Publication Society, Kandy 2011, ISBN 955-24-0023-6.
  - This translation is available in several digital formats (PDF, HTML, ePub) from https://eudoxos.github.io/vism
- Buddhist Meditation, Edward Conze (trans.), NB: Partial translation, 2002, ISBN 81-215-0781-2

=== Other European translations ===
- Der Weg zur Reinheit, Nyanatiloka & Verlag Christiani (trans.), Konstanz, 1952 (German)
- Le chemin de la pureté, Christian Maës, Fayard 2002 (Français), ISBN 978-2213607658

== See also ==
- Buddhaghosa
- Vimuttimagga
- Patisambhidamagga
- Śīla
- Samatha
- Vipassanā

== Sources ==
- Gunaratana, Henepola (1994), The Path of Serenity and Insight, Delhi: Motilal Banarsidass Publishers Private Limited
- Kalupahana, David J. (1994), A history of Buddhist philosophy, Delhi: Motilal Banarsidass Publishers Private Limited
- Nyanamoli, Bhikkhu (2011), The Path of Purification, Visuddhimagga, Kandy: Buddhist Publication Society, ISBN 978-955-24-0023-0
- Shankman, Richard (2008), The Experience of Samadhi: An In-depth Exploration of Buddhist Meditation, Shambhala
- Shaw, Sarah (2006), Buddhist Meditation: An Anthology of Texts from the Pali Canon, Routledge
- Sujato, Bhante (2012), A History of Mindfulness (PDF), Santipada, ISBN 9781921842092. ISBN 9781921842108
- Thanissaro Bhikkhu (trans.) (1999). Ratha-vinita Sutta: Relay Chariots (MN 24).
