= Majjhima Nikāya =

2nd Buddhist Scriptures Collection in Pāli Canon

- SuttaCentral; OpenTipitaka
- Type: Canonical text
- Parent: Sutta Piṭaka
- Attribution: Sāriputta; Bhāṇaka
- Aṭṭhakathā: Papañcasūdanī (Majjhimanikāya-aṭṭhakathā)
- Commentator: Buddhaghosa
- Ṭīkā: Līnatthappakāsinī (Mūlapaṇṇāsa-ṭīkā, Majjhimapaṇṇāsaṭīkā, Uparipaṇṇāsa-ṭīkā)
- Abbreviation: MN; M

The Majjhima Nikāya ("Collection of Middle-length Discourses") is a Buddhist scripture collection, the second of the five nikāyas, or collections, in the Sutta Piṭaka, which is one of the "three baskets" that comprise the Pāli Tipiṭaka (lit. "Three Baskets") of Theravāda Buddhism. This nikāya consists of 152 discourses attributed to the Buddha and his chief disciples.

== Overview ==
Bhikkhu Bodhi in the introduction to his translation describes the collection as follows:

If the Majjhima Nikāya were to be characterised by a single phrase to distinguish it from among the other books of the Pali Canon, this might be done by describing it as the collection that combines the richest variety of contextual settings with the deepest and most comprehensive assortment of teachings.

The 152 discourses come in three parts each with five divisions. All divisions save the penultimate contain 10 discourses.

=== Parallel ===
The Majjhima Nikāya corresponds to the Madhyama Āgama found in the Sutra Piṭakas of various early Buddhist schools, fragments of which survive in Sanskrit and in Tibetan translation. A complete Chinese translation from the Sarvāstivādin recension appears in the Chinese Buddhist canon, where it is known as the Zhōng Āhánjīng (中阿含經). The Madhyama Āgama of the Sarvāstivāda school contains 222 sūtras, in contrast to the 152 suttas in the Pāli Majjhima Nikāya. Bhikkhu Anālayo has done a detailed comparative study of the Majjhima Nikāya discourses in the light of their various parallels.

== Translations ==
=== Full translations ===
- Bhikkhu Ñāṇamoli; Bhikkhu Bodhi (trans.) (1995). The Middle Length Discourses of the Buddha: A Translation of the Majjhima Nikāya. Somerville: Wisdom Publications. p. 1420. ISBN 0-86171-072-X..
- Mahapandit Rahul Sankrityayan translated Majjhima Nikāya from Prakrit to Hindi.
- Lord Chalmers, trans. (1898–1926), Further Dialogues of the Buddha, 1926–7, vol.1, vol. 2, London: Pali Text Society. Reprint: Ann Arbor: Books on Demand, University of Michigan.
- I.B. Horner (trans.), The Book of Middle Length Sayings, 1954–9, 3 volumes, Bristol: Pali Text Society.
- David W. Evans (trans.), Discourses of Gotama Buddha: Middle Collection, 1991, Janus Pubns. "Translation in an abridged form ... just about one third the size of Horner's translation, but with well over 90% of the significant content"
- Bhikkhu Sujato (trans.), The Middle Discourses, 2018, published online at SuttaCentral and released into the public domain.

=== Selections ===
- A Treasury of the Buddha's Words, tr Nanamoli, revised Khantipalo, Bangkok; later revised and expanded to produce the Middle Length Discourses of the Buddha
- Twenty-Five Suttas from Mula-Pannasa, Burma Pitaka Association, Rangoon, 1986?; reprinted Sri Satguru, Delhi
- Twenty-Five Suttas from Majjhima-Pannasa, Myanmar Pitaka Association, Rangoon, 1987; reprinted Sri Satguru, Delhi
- Twenty-Five Suttas from Upari-Pannasa, Myanmar Pitaka Association, Rangoon, 1988?; reprinted Sri Satguru, Delhi

== See also ==
- Pāli Canon
- Early Buddhist Texts
- Sutta Piṭaka
- List of Majjhima Nikāya suttas
- Aṅguttara Nikāya
- Dīgha Nikāya
- Khuddaka Nikāya
- Saṃyutta Nikāya
- Sammādiṭṭhi Sutta
- Ānāpānasati Sutta
- Parable of the Poisoned Arrow
