= Aṅguttara Nikāya =

4th Buddhist Scriptures Collection in Pāli Canon

- SuttaCentral; OpenTipitaka
- Type: Canonical text
- Parent: Sutta Piṭaka
- Attribution: Anuruddha; Bhāṇaka
- Aṭṭhakathā: Manorathapūraṇī (Aṅguttaranikāya-aṭṭhakathā)
- Commentator: Buddhaghosa
- Ṭīkā: Sāratthamañjūsā (Ekakanipāta-ṭīkā, Dukanipāta-ṭīkā, Pañcakanipāta-ṭīkā, Aṭṭhakanipāta-ṭīkā)
- Abbreviation: AN; A

The Aṅguttara Nikāya (aṅguttaranikāya; lit. 'Increased-by-One Collection', also translated "Gradual Collection" or "Numerical Discourses") is a Buddhist scriptures collection, the fourth of the five Nikāyas, or collections, in the Sutta Piṭaka, which is one of the "three baskets" that comprise the Pāli Tipiṭaka of Theravāda Buddhism. This nikāya consists of several thousand discourses ascribed to the Buddha and his chief disciples arranged in eleven "books", according to the number of Dhamma items referenced in them.

== Overview ==
Translator Bhikkhu Bodhi wrote: "In Aṅguttara Nikāya, persons are as a rule not reduced to mere collections of aggregates, elements, and sense-bases, but are treated as real centers of living experience engaged in a heartfelt quest for happiness and freedom from suffering."

=== Parallel ===
The Aṅguttara Nikāya corresponds to the Ekottara Āgama ("Increased by One Discourses") found in the Sūtra Piṭakas of various Sanskritic early Buddhists schools, fragments of which survive in Sanskrit. A nearly complete version of the Saṃyukta Āgama survives in Chinese translation by the name Zēngyī Ahánjīng (增一阿含經); based on an Indic original of Mūlasarvāstivāda provenance.

== Divisions ==
The nipatas in this nikaya are:

Nipāta	Vagga
Ekakanipāto (The Book of Ones)	1. Rūpādivaggo; 2. Nīvaraṇappahānavaggo; 3. Akammaniyavaggo; 4. Adantavaggo; 5. Paṇihitaacchavaggo; 6. Accharāsaṅghātavaggo; 7. Vīriyārambhādivaggo; 8. Kalyāṇamittādivaggo; 9. Pamādādivaggo; 10. Dutiyapamādādivaggo; 11. Adhammavaggo; 12. Anāpattivaggo; 13. Ekapuggalavaggo; 14. Etadaggavaggo; 15. Aṭṭhānapāḷi; 16. Ekadhammapāḷi; 17. Pasādakaradhammavaggo; 18. Aparaaccharāsaṅghātavaggo; 19. Kāyagatāsativaggo; 20. Amatavaggo
Dukanipāto (The Book of Twos)	1. Kammakaraṇavaggo; 2. Adhikaraṇavaggo; 3. Bālavaggo; 4. Samacittavaggo; 5. Parisavaggo; (6) 1. Puggalavaggo; (7) 2. Sukhavaggo; (8) 3. Sanimittavaggo; (9) 4. Dhammavaggo; (10) 5. Bālavaggo; (11) 1. Āsāduppajahavaggo; (12) 2. Āyācanavaggo; (13) 3. Dānavaggo; (14) 4. Santhāravaggo; (15) 5. Samāpattivaggo; 1. Kodhapeyyālaṃ; 2. Akusalapeyyālaṃ; 3. Vinayapeyyālaṃ; 4. Rāgapeyyālaṃ
Tikanipāto (The Book of Threes)	1. Bālavaggo; 2. Rathakāravaggo; 3. Puggalavaggo; 4. Devadūtavaggo; 5. Cūḷavaggo; (6) 1. Brāhmaṇavaggo; (7) 2. Mahāvaggo; (8) 3. Ānandavaggo; (9) 4. Samaṇavaggo; (10) 5. Loṇakapallavaggo; (11) 1. Sambodhavaggo; (12) 2. Āpāyikavaggo; (13) 3. Kusināravaggo; (14) 4. Yodhājīvavaggo; (15) 5. Maṅgalavaggo; (16) 6. Acelakavaggo; (17) 7. Kammapathapeyyālaṃ; (18) 8. Rāgapeyyālaṃ
Catukkanipāto (The Book of Fours)	1. Bhaṇḍagāmavaggo; 2. Caravaggo; 3. Uruvelavaggo; 4. Cakkavaggo; 5. Rohitassavaggo; (6) 1. Puññābhisandavaggo; (7) 2. Pattakammavaggo; (8) 3. Apaṇṇakavaggo; (9) 4. Macalavaggo; (10) 5. Asuravaggo; (11) 1. Valāhakavaggo; (12) 2. Kesivaggo; (13) 3. Bhayavaggo; (14) 4. Puggalavaggo; (15) 5. Ābhāvaggo; (16) 1. Indriyavaggo; (17) 2. Paṭipadāvaggo; (18) 3. Sañcetaniyavaggo; (19) 4. Brāhmaṇavaggo; (20) 5. Mahāvaggo; (21) 1. Sappurisavaggo; (22) 2. Parisāvaggo; (23) 3. Duccaritavaggo; (24) 4. Kammavaggo; (25) 5. Āpattibhayavaggo; (26) 6. Abhiññāvaggo; (27) 7. Kammapathavaggo; (28) 8. Rāgapeyyālaṃ
Pañcakanipāto (The Book of Fives)	1. Sekhabalavaggo; 2. Balavaggo; 3. Pañcaṅgikavaggo; 4. Sumanavaggo; 5. Muṇḍarājavaggo; (6) 1. Nīvaraṇavaggo; (7) 2. Saññāvaggo; (8) 3. Yodhājīvavaggo; (9) 4. Theravaggo; (10) 5. Kakudhavaggo; (11) 1. Phāsuvihāravaggo; (12) 2. Andhakavindavaggo; (13) 3. Gilānavaggo; (14) 4. Rājavaggo; (15) 5. Tikaṇḍakīvaggo; (16) 1. Saddhammavaggo; (17) 2. Āghātavaggo; (18) 3. Upāsakavaggo; (19) 4. Araññavaggo; (20) 5. Brāhmaṇavaggo; (21) 1. Kimilavaggo; (22) 2. Akkosakavaggo; (23) 3. Dīghacārikavaggo; (24) 4. Āvāsikavaggo; (25) 5. Duccaritavaggo; (26) 6. Upasampadāvaggo; 1. Sammutipeyyālaṃ; 2. Sikkhāpadapeyyālaṃ; 3. Rāgapeyyālaṃ
Chakkanipāto (The Book of Sixes)	1. Āhuneyyavaggo; 2. Sāraṇīyavaggo; 3. Anuttariyavaggo; 4. Devatāvaggo; 5. Dhammikavaggo; 6. Mahāvaggo; 7. Devatāvaggo; 8. Arahattavaggo; 9. Sītivaggo; 10. Ānisaṃsavaggo; 11. Tikavaggo; 12. Sāmaññavaggo; 13. Rāgapeyyālaṃ
Sattakanipāto (The Book of Sevens)	1. Dhanavaggo; 2. Anusayavaggo; 3. Vajjisattakavaggo; 4. Devatāvaggo; 5. Mahāyaññavaggo; 6. Abyākatavaggo; 7. Mahāvaggo; 8. Vinayavaggo; 9. Samaṇavaggo; 10. Āhuneyyavaggo; 11. Rāgapeyyālaṃ
Aṭṭhakanipāto (The Book of Eights)	1. Mettāvaggo; 2. Mahāvaggo; 3. Gahapativaggo; 4. Dānavaggo; 5. Uposathavaggo; (6) 1. Gotamīvaggo; (7) 2. Bhūmicālavaggo; (8) 3. Yamakavaggo; (9) 4. Sativaggo; (10) 5. Sāmaññavaggo; (11). Rāgapeyyālaṃ
Navakanipāto (The Book of Nines)	1. Sambodhivaggo; 2. Sīhanādavaggo; 3. Sattāvāsavaggo; 4. Mahāvaggo; 5. Sāmaññavaggo; (6) 1. Khemavaggo; (7) 2. Satipaṭṭhānavaggo; (8) 3. Sammappadhānavaggo; (9) 4. Iddhipādavaggo; (10) 5. Rāgapeyyālaṃ
Dasakanipāto (The Book of Tens)	1. Ānisaṃsavaggo; 2. Nāthavaggo; 3. Mahāvaggo; 4. Upālivaggo; 5. Akkosavaggo; (6) 1. Sacittavaggo; (7) 2. Yamakavaggo; (8) 3. Ākaṅkhavaggo; (9) 4. Theravaggo; (10) 5. Upālivaggo; (11) 1. Samaṇasaññāvaggo; (12) 2. Paccorohaṇivaggo; (13) 3. Parisuddhavaggo; (14) 4. Sādhuvaggo; (15) 5. Ariyavaggo; (16) 1. Puggalavaggo; (17) 2. Jāṇussoṇivaggo; (18) 3. Sādhuvaggo; (19) 4. Ariyamaggavaggo; (20) 5. Aparapuggalavaggo; (21) 1. Karajakāyavaggo; (22) 2. Sāmaññavaggo; 23. Rāgapeyyālaṃ
Ekādasako nipāto (The Book of Elevens)	1. Nissayavaggo; 2. Anussativaggo; 3. Sāmaññavaggo; 4. Rāgapeyyālaṃ

== Translations ==
=== Full translation ===
- The Book of the Gradual Sayings, tr F. L. Woodward & E. M. Hare, 1932–6, 5 volumes, Pali Text Society, Bristol
- Numerical Discourses of the Buddha, tr Bhikkhu Bodhi, 2012, 1 volume, Wisdom Publications , Somerville, MA
- Bhikkhu Sujato (trans.), The “Numbered” or “Numerical” Discourses, 2018, published online at SuttaCentral and released into the public domain.

=== Selections ===
- 1st 3 nipatas tr E. R. J. Gooneratne, Ceylon, c1913
- 4th nipata tr A. D. Jayasundare, London, 1925
- anthology ed & tr Nyanaponika, Buddhist Publication Society, Kandy, Sri Lanka; revised, with additions & deletions, by Bodhi, as Numerical Discourses of the Buddha, Altamira Press, Oxford/New York/Lanham, Maryland/Walnut Creek, California, 1999

== See also ==
- Early Buddhist Texts
- Dīgha Nikāya
- Khuddaka Nikāya
- Majjhima Nikāya
- Pāli Cannon
- Saṃyutta Nikāya
- Sutta Piṭaka
- Dīghajāṇu Sutta
