= Basic Points Unifying Theravāda and Mahāyāna =

Buddhist ecumenical statement in 1967

The Basic Points Unifying the Theravāda and the Mahāyāna is an important Buddhist ecumenical statement created in 1967 during the First Congress of the World Buddhist Sangha Council (WBSC), where its founder Secretary-General, the late Venerable Pandita Pimbure Sorata Thera, requested the Ven. Walpola Rahula Thera to present a concise formula for the unification of all the different Buddhist traditions. This text was then unanimously approved by the council.

== Text of the original document ==
1. The Buddha is our only Master (Teacher and Guide).
2. We take refuge in the Buddha, the Dharma and the Saṅgha (Three Jewels).
3. We do not believe that this world is created and ruled by a God.
4. We consider that the purpose of life is to develop compassion for all living beings without discrimination and to work for their good, happiness, and peace; and to develop wisdom (prajñā) leading to the realization of Ultimate Truth.
5. We accept the Four Noble Truths, namely duḥkha, the arising of duḥkha, the cessation of duḥkha, and the path leading to the cessation of duḥkha; and the law of cause and effect (pratītyasamutpāda).
6. All conditioned things (saṃskāra) are impermanent (anitya) and duḥkha, and that all conditioned and unconditioned things (dharma) are without self (anātma) (Three marks of existence).
7. We accept the thirty-seven qualities conducive to enlightenment (bodhipakṣadharma) as different aspects of the Path taught by the Buddha leading to Enlightenment.
8. There are three ways of attaining bodhi or Enlightenment: namely as a disciple (śrāvaka), as a pratyekabuddha and as a samyaksambuddha (perfectly and fully enlightened Buddha). We accept it as the highest, noblest, and most heroic to follow the career of a Bodhisattva and to become a samyaksambuddha in order to save others.
9. We admit that in different countries there are differences regarding Buddhist beliefs and practices. These external forms and expressions should not be confused with the essential teachings of the Buddha.

== Expansion of the formula ==
Ven. Walpola Sri Rahula in 1981 offered an alternative to the formula above restating it as follows:

1. Whatever our sects, denominations or systems, as Buddhists we all accept the Buddha as our Master who gave us the Teaching.
2. We all take refuge in the Triple Jewel: the Buddha, our Teacher; the Dhamma, his teaching; and the Sangha, the Community of holy ones. In other words, we take refuge in the Teacher, the Teaching and the Taught.
3. Whether Theravāda or Mahāyāna, we do not believe that this world is created and ruled by a god at his will.
4. Following the example of the Buddha, our Teacher, who is embodiment of Great Compassion (mahākaruṇa) and Great Wisdom (mahāprajñā), we consider that the purpose of life is to develop compassion for all living beings without discrimination and to work for their good, happiness and peace; and to develop wisdom leading to the realization of Ultimate Truth.
5. We accept the Four Noble Truths taught by the Buddha, namely, Dukkha, the fact that our existence in this world is in predicament, is impermanent, imperfect, unsatisfactory, full of conflict; Samudaya, the fact that this state of affairs is due to our egoistic selfishness based on the false idea of self; Nirodha, the fact that there is definitely the possibility of deliverance, liberation, freedom from this predicament by the total eradication of the egoistic selfishness; and Magga, the fact that this liberation can be achieved through the Middle Path which is eight-fold, leading to the perfection of ethical conduct (sila), mental discipline (samadhi) and wisdom (panna). We accept the universal law of cause and effect taught in the Paṭiccasamuppada (Skt. Pratītyasamutpada; Conditioned Genesis or Dependent Origination), and accordingly we accept that everything is relative, interdependent and interrelated and nothing is absolute, permanent and everlasting in this universe.
6. We understand, according to the teaching of the Buddha, that all conditioned things (sankhara) are impermanent (anicca) and imperfect and unsatisfactory (dukkha), and all conditioned and unconditioned things (dhamma) are without self (anatta).
7. We accept the Thirty-seven Qualities conducive to Enlightenment (bodhipakkhiyadhamma) as different aspects of the Path taught by the Buddha leading to Enlightenment, namely:
  - Four Forms of Presence of Mindfulness (Pali: satipatthana; Skt. smrtyupasthana);
  - Four Right Efforts (Pali. sammappadhana; Skt. samyakpradhana);
  - Four Bases of Supernatural Powers (Pali. iddhipada; Skt. rddhipada);
  - Five Faculties (indriya: Pali. saddha, viriya, sati, samadhi, panna; Skt. sraddha, virya, smrti, samadhi, prajna);
  - Five Powers (bala, same five qualities as above);
  - Seven Factors of Enlightenment (Pali. bojjhanga; Skt. bodhyanga);
  - Eightfold Noble Path (Pali. ariyamagga; Skt. aryamarga).
8. There are three ways of attaining Bodhi or Enlightenment according to the ability and capacity of each individual: namely, as a Śrāvaka (disciple), as a Pratyekabuddha (Individual Buddha) and as a Samyaksambuddha (Perfectly and Fully Enlightened Buddha). We accept it as the highest, noblest and most heroic to follow the career of a Bodhisattva and to become a Samyaksambuddha in order to save others. But these three states are on the same Path, not on different paths. In fact, the Sandhinirmocana Sutra, a well-known important Mahayana sutra, clearly and emphatically says that those who follow the line of Śrāvakayāna (Vehicle of Disciples) or the line of Pratyekabuddhayāna (Vehicle of Individual Buddhas) or the line of Tathāgatas (Mahayana) attain the supreme Nirvana by the same Path, and that for all of them there is only one Path of Purification (visuddhimarga) and only one Purification (visuddhi) and no second one, and that they are not different paths and different purifications, and that Śrāvakayāna and Mahayana constitute One Vehicle One Yana (ekayāna) and not distinct and different vehicles or yanas.
9. We admit that in different countries there are differences with regard to the ways of life of Buddhist monks, popular Buddhist beliefs and practices, rites and rituals, ceremonies, customs and habits. These external forms and expressions should not be confused with the essential teachings of the Buddha.

== See also ==
- Index of Buddhism-related articles
- Secular Buddhism
- World Buddhist Forum
- World Fellowship of Buddhists
