= Buddhist paths to liberation =

Summaries of the Buddhist path to liberation

The Buddhist path (Sanskrit: marga; Pali: magga) to liberation, also referred to as awakening, is described in a wide variety of ways. The Noble Eightfold Path is prominent in Theravada Buddhism and popularly well-known, but is only one of several summaries presented in the Sutta Pitaka. A number of other summaries of the path to liberation are given within various Buddhist traditions, of which the four stages of dhyana may be the most prominent one.

== Early Buddhism ==
There are various expositions of the path to liberation in the Early Buddhist texts, the following examples are drawn from the Pali Nikayas.

=== The Noble Eightfold Path ===
The Noble Eightfold Path is widely known as the description of the Buddhist path. In the Sutta Pitaka it is summed up as follows:

The Blessed One said, "Now what, monks, is the Noble Eightfold Path? Right view, right resolve, right speech, right action, right livelihood, right effort, right mindfulness, right concentration [samadhi].

==== The four dhyanas ====
While the noble eightfold path is popularly well-known, the four dhyanas, which are included in the noble eightfold path as the eight limb, samadhi, may actually be the most prominent scheme. In the sutras, jhāna is entered when one 'sits down cross-legged and establishes mindfulness'. According to Buddhist tradition, it may be supported by ānāpānasati, mindfulness of breathing, a core meditative practice which can be found in almost all schools of Buddhism. The Suttapiṭaka and the Agamas describe four stages of rūpa jhāna. Rūpa refers to the material realm, in a neutral stance, as different from the kāma-realm (lust, desire) and the arūpa-realm (non-material realm). While interpreted in the Theravada-tradition as describing a deepening concentration and one-pointedness, originally the jhānas seem to describe a development from investigating body and mind and abandoning unwholesome states, to perfected equanimity and watchfulness, an understanding which is retained in Zen and Dzogchen. The stock description of the jhānas, with traditional and alternative interpretations, is as follows: (Note: Keren Arbel refers to Majjhima Nikaya 26, Ariyapariyesana Sutta, The Noble Search See also: * Majjhima Nikaya 111, Anuppada Sutta * AN 05.028, Samadhanga Sutta: The Factors of Concentration. See Johansson (1981), Pali Buddhist texts Explained to Beginners for a word-by-word translation.)

1. First jhāna:
  Separated (vivicceva) from desire for sensual pleasures, separated (vivicca) from [other] unwholesome states (akusalehi dhammehi, unwholesome dhammas), a bhikkhu enters upon and abides in the first jhana, which is [mental] pīti ("rapture," "joy") and [bodily] sukha ("pleasure"; also: 'lasting', in contrast to 'transient' (dukkha)) "born of viveka" (traditionally, "seclusion"; alternatively, "discrimination" (of dhamma's) (Note: Arbel explains that "viveka" is usually translated as "detachment," "separation," or "seclusion," but the primary meaning is "discrimination." According to Arbel, the usage of vivicca/vivicceva and viveka in the description of the first dhyana "plays with both meanings of the verb; namely, its meaning as discernment and the consequent 'seclusion' and letting go," in line with the "discernment of the nature of experience" developed by the four satipatthanas. Compare Dogen: "Being apart from all disturbances and dwelling alone in a quiet place is called "enjoying serenity and tranquility."" Arbel further argues that viveka resembles dhamma vicaya, which is mentioned in the bojjhanga, an alternative description of the dhyanas, but the only bojjhanga-term not mentioned in the stock dhyana-description. Compare Sutta Nipatha 5.14 Udayamāṇavapucchā (The Questions of Udaya): "Pure equanimity and mindfulness, preceded by investigation of principles—this, I declare, is liberation by enlightenment, the smashing of ignorance.” (Translation: Sujato))), accompanied by vitarka-vicara (traditionally, initial and sustained attention to a meditative object; alternatively, initial inquiry and subsequent investigation of dhammas (defilements and wholesome thoughts (Note: Stta Nipatha 5:13 Udaya’s Questions (transl. Thanissaro): "With delight the world’s fettered. With directed thought it’s examined." Chen 2017: "Samadhi with general examination and specific in-depth investigation means getting rid of the not virtuous dharmas, such as greedy desire and hatred, to stay in joy and pleasure caused by nonarising, and to enter the first meditation and fully dwell in it." Arbel 2016, p. 73: "Thus, my suggestion is that we should interpret the existence of vitakka and vicara in the first jhana as wholesome 'residues' of a previous development of wholesome thoughts. They denote the 'echo' of these wholesome thoughts, which reverberates in one who enters the first jhana as wholesome attitudes toward what is experienced.")); also: "discursive thought" (Note: In the Pali canon, Vitakka-vicāra form one expression, which refers to directing one's thought or attention on an object (vitarka) and investigate it (vicāra). According to Dan Lusthaus, vitarka-vicāra is analytic scrutiny, a form of prajna. It "involves focusing on [something] and then breaking it down into its functional components" to understand it, "distinguishing the multitude of conditioning factors implicated in a phenomenal event." The Theravada commentarial tradition, as represented by Buddhaghosa's Visuddhimagga, interprets vitarka and vicāra as the initial and sustained application of attention to a meditational object, which culminates in the stilling of the mind when moving on to the second dhyana. According to Martin Stuart-Fox and Rod Bucknell it may also refer to "the normal process of discursive thought," which is quieted through absorption in the second jhāna.)).
2. Second jhāna:
  Again, with the stilling of vitarka-vicara, a bhikkhu enters upon and abides in the second jhana, which is [mental] pīti and [bodily] sukha "born of samadhi" (samadhi-ji; trad. born of "concentration"; altern. "knowing but non-discursive [...] awareness," "bringing the buried latencies or samskaras into full view" (Note: The standard translation for samadhi is "concentration"; yet, this translation/interpretation is based on commentarial interpretations, as explained by a number of contemporary authors. Tilmann Vetter notes that samadhi has a broad range of meanings, and "concentration" is just one of them. Vetter argues that the second, third and fourth dhyana are samma-samadhi, "right samadhi," building on a "spontaneous awareness" (sati) and equanimity which is perfected in the fourth dhyana.)), and has sampasadana ("stillness," "inner tranquility" (Note: The common translation, based on the commentarial interpretation of dhyana as expanding states of absorption, translates sampasadana as "internal assurance." Yet, as Bucknell explains, it also means "tranquilizing," which is more apt in this context. See also Passaddhi.)) and ekaggata (unification of mind, awareness) without vitarka-vicara;
3. Third jhāna:
  With the fading away of pīti, a bhikkhu abides in upekkhā (equanimity," "affective detachment" (Note: Upekkhā is one of the Brahmaviharas.)), sato (mindful) and [with] sampajañña ("fully knowing," "discerning awareness"). [Still] experiencing sukha with the body, he enters upon and abides in the third jhana, on account of which the noble ones announce, "abiding in [bodily] pleasure, one is equanimous and mindful".
4. Fourth jhāna:
  With the abandoning of [the desire for] sukha ("pleasure") and [aversion to] dukkha ("pain") and with the previous disappearance of [the inner movement between] somanassa ("gladness,") and domanassa ("discontent"), a bhikkhu enters upon and abides in the fourth jhana, which is adukkham asukham ("neither-painful-nor-pleasurable," "freedom from pleasure and pain") and has upekkhā-sati-parisuddhi (complete purity of equanimity and mindfulness). (Note: With the fourth jhāna comes the attainment of higher knowledge (abhijñā), that is, the extinction of all mental intoxicants (āsava), but also psychic powers. For instance in AN 5.28, the Buddha states (Thanissaro, 1997.): "When a monk has developed and pursued the five-factored noble right concentration in this way, then whichever of the six higher knowledges he turns his mind to know and realize, he can witness them for himself whenever there is an opening...." "If he wants, he wields manifold supranormal powers. Having been one he becomes many; having been many he becomes one. He appears. He vanishes. He goes unimpeded through walls, ramparts, and mountains as if through space. He dives in and out of the earth as if it were water. He walks on water without sinking as if it were dry land. Sitting crosslegged he flies through the air like a winged bird. With his hand he touches and strokes even the sun and moon, so mighty and powerful. He exercises influence with his body even as far as the Brahma worlds. He can witness this for himself whenever there is an opening ...")

=== Alternate sequences in the Pali Nikayas ===
Alternate, and possibly older than the formula noble eightfold path, sequences of the stages on the Buddhist path to liberation, can be found throughout the Pali Canon.

==== Tevijja Sutta ====
A standard sequence of developments can be found in the Nikayas, which may predate the more stylised four noble truths. For example the Tevijja Sutta verse 40–75 (Digha Nikaya 13): (Note: metta.lk, Tevijja Sutra)

- Verse 40: A Tathàgata is born into the world, who makes his knowledge known to others.
- Verse 41: A householder listens to that truth, acquires faith, and goes forth from the household life into the homeless state.
- Verse 42: He passes a life self-restrained, good in his conduct, guarding the door of his senses; mindful and self-possessed.
- Verse 43–75: This results in:
  - The confidence of heart that results from the sense of goodness.
  - The way in which he guards the doors of his senses.
  - The way in which he is mindful and self-possessed.
  - His habit of being content with little, of adopting simplicity of life.
  - His conquest of the five hindrances, each with the explanatory simile.
  - The joy and peace which, as a result of this conquest, fills his whole being.

==== Cula-Hatthipadopama-sutta ====
According to Rod Bucknell, another listing of path stages occurs in various places in the Majjhima Nikaya, and can be illustrated with the following list of stages from the Cula-Hatthipadopama-sutta (Lesser Discourse on the Simile of the Elephant's Footprints).

1. Dhamma / saddha/ pabbajja: A layman hears a Buddha teach the Dhamma, comes to have faith in him, and decides to take ordination as a monk.
2. Sila: He adopts the moral precepts.
3. Indriyasamvara (element of right effort): He practises "guarding the six sense-doors."
4. Sati-sampajanna: He practises mindfulness and self-possession (actually described as mindfulness of the body, kayanussati).
5. Jhana 1: He finds an isolated spot in which to meditate, purifies his mind of the hindrances (nivarana), and attains the first rupa-jhana.
6. Jhana 2: He attains the second jhana.
7. Jhana 3: He attains the third jhana.
8. Jhana 4: He attains the fourth jhana.
9. Pubbenivasanussati-ñana: He recollects his many former existences in samsara.
10. Sattanam cutupapata-ñana: He observes the death and rebirth of beings according to their karmas.
11. Asavakkhaya-ñana: He brings about the destruction of the asavas (cankers), and attains a profound realization of (as opposed to mere knowledge about) the Four Noble Truths.
12. Vimutti: He perceives that he is now liberated, that he has done what was to be done.

==== Maha-Assapura-sutta ====
According to Bucknell, in this sutta the Buddha gives the following list of "things that are to be done by recluses and brahmans":

1. hiri-ottappa: The recluse or brahman cultivates a sense of shame and fear of blame.
2. parisuddha kaya-samacara – He cultivates pure conduct of body.
3. parisuddha vaci-samacara: He cultivates pure conduct of speech.
4. parisuddha mano-samacara: He cultivates pure conduct of mind.
5. parisuddha ajiva: He cultivates pure livelihood.
6. indriyasamvara: He guards the six sense-doors.
7. bhojane mattaññuta: He exercises restraint in eating.
8. jagariya: He practises wakefulness.
9. Sati-sampajanna: He is mindful and self-possessed.
10. First Jhana
11. Second Jhana
12. Third Jhana
13. Fourth Jhana
14. Pubbenivasanussati-ñana: He recollects his former existences.
15. Sattanam cutupapata-ñana: He observes the death and rebirth of beings.
16. Asavakkhaya-ñana – Vimutti: He destroys the asavas, realizes the four noble truths, and perceives that he is liberated

==== Sekha-sutta ====
According to Bucknell, in the Sekha sutta the Buddha prompts Ananda to teach a "learner's course" to a group of disciples, which goes thus:

1. sila
2. indriyasamvara (element of right effort): He practises "guarding the six sense-doors."
3. bhojane mattaññuta, restraint in eating.
4. jagariya, wakefulness.
5. satta saddhamma: He develops the seven "excellent qualities" (saddha, hiri, ottappa, bahussuta, viriya, sati, pañña – faith, sense of shame, fear of blame, hearing much, energy, mindfulness, insight)
6. jhana: He attains without difficulty the four jhanas.
7. Pubbenivasanussati-ñana: He recollects his former existences.
8. Sattanam cutupapata-ñana: He observes the death and rebirth of beings.
9. Asavakkhaya-ñana – Vimutti: He destroys the asavas and perceives that he is liberated.

=== Various sequences in the Madhyama Agama ===
According to Bhikkhu Sujato, the Chinese Madhyama Agama of the Sarvastivada school includes some exposition of the gradual path not available in the Pali Nikayas of the Theravada school. He outlines three main such expositions of the path, from the following sutras, MA 44, MA 54, and MA 55:

==== MA 44 ====
Mindfulness & clear comprehension → protection of sense faculties → protection of precepts → non-remorse → gladness → rapture → bliss → samādhi → knowledge & vision of things as they have become → repulsion → fading of lust → liberation → Nibbana.

==== MA 54 ====
Honouring and attending upon → approaching → listening to the good Dhamma → giving ear → consideration of the meaning of the Dhamma → learning the Dhamma by heart → recital → reflective acceptance → faith → right consideration → mindfulness&clear comprehension → protection of the sense faculties → protection of precepts → nonremorse → gladness → rapture → bliss → samādhi → knowledge & vision of things as they have become → repulsion → fading of lust → liberation → Nibbana.

==== MA 55 ====
Ignorance → conceptual activities → cognition → name & form → six senses → contact → feeling → craving → grasping → existence → birth → aging & death → suffering → faith → right consideration → mindfulness & clear comprehension → protection of sense faculties → protection of precepts → non-remorse → gladness → rapture → bliss → samādhi → knowledge& vision of things as they have become → repulsion → fading of lust → liberation → Nibbana.

=== Bodhipakkhiyādhammā ===
The Noble Eightfold Path is one of the lists in the bodhipakkhiyā dhammā, a term used in the Pali commentaries to refer to seven sets of qualities or aids to awakening regularly ascribed the Buddha throughout the Pali Canon, each summarizing the Buddhist path. (Note: Regarding the use of the compound Pali term bodhipakkhiyā dhammā in the canonical discourses, based on a search of the Sinhala SLTP tipitaka using the La Trobe University search engine at "La Trobe University: Pali Canon Online Database". Archived from the original on 2007-09-27., the term bodhipakkhiyā dhammā (and its variant spellings and declensions) was found in following nine discourses in the Sutta Pitaka: 1. DN 27 (Aggañña Sutta); 2. SN 48.51 (Sālā Sutta); 3. SN 48.55 (Sāra Sutta); 4. SN 48.67 (Rukkha Sutta); 5. AN 5.56 (Upajjhāya Sutta); 6. AN 6.17 (Kusala Sutta or Soppa Sutta); 7. AN 9.1 (Sambodhipakkhiya Sutta); 8. Iti. 82 (Devasadda Sutta); 9. Iti. 97 (Kalyāṇasīla Sutta); The Digha Nikaya (DN 27) and Itivuttaka (Iti., 82, 97) discourses each refer to "seven" (satta) factors of enlightenment. In his translation of DN 27, Walshe (1995, pp. 415 para. 30, 605 n. 854) interprets the "seven" to refer to the seven enlightenment factors (satta bojjhaṅgā) described in the Mahasatipatthana Sutta (DN 22). Conversely, in their translations of the Itivuttaka discourses, Ireland (1997) and Thanissaro (2001) interpret the "seven" as referring to the "seven groups of" or "seven [sets of]" factors of enlightenment, respectively. None of these three discourses themselves explicitly identifies which seven factors or sets of factors are being referenced. Moreover, the Anguttara Nikaya (AN 5.56, 6.17, 9.1) discourses neither numerically quantify nor elaborate upon the terms bodhipakkhiyānaṃ dhammānaṃ, bodhapakkhiyānaṃ dhammānaṃ or sambodhipakkhiyānaṃ ... dhammānaṃ (respectively). Uniquely, in the three discourses from the Samyutta Nikaya (48.51, 48.55, 48.57), all three explicitly associate the term bodhipakkhiyā dhammā (and variant spellings) solely with the five faculties (indriya) of faith, energy, mindfulness, concentration and wisdom (Bodhi, 2000, p. 1695). Perhaps summing up the vagueness and apparent inconsistencies in these identified discourses and their translations, in an end note to the Sālā Sutta (SN 48.51) Bodhi (2000, p. 1937 n. 235) comments: "In the commentaries bodhipakkhiyā dhammā is the umbrella term for the seven sets of training factors repeatedly taught by the Buddha, but in the suttas the expression has a more flexible, less technical meaning." Bodhi then refers to Gethin (1992), pp. 289–298, for further discussion.) Within these seven sets of awakening qualities, there is a total of thirty-seven overlapping and repetitive factors or qualities. (Note: For a survey of references to these qualities, see, for instance, Rhys Davids & Stede (1921–25), p. 491, entries on "bodha," available at ["Bodha". The Pali Text Society's Pali-English Dictionary. Archived from the original on 2019-05-02.], and on "bodhi," available at ["Bodhi". The Pali Text Society's Pali-English Dictionary. Archived from the original on 2019-05-02.]; Bodhi (2000), pp. 1485–1486, notes: "In the Buddhist exegetical tradition, beginning very soon after the age of the canon, these seven sets are known as the thirty-seven aids to enlightenment (sattatiṃsa bodhipakkhiyā dhammā). Although this term is not used in the Nikāyas themselves as a collective appellation for the seven sets, the sets themselves frequently appear in the Nikāyas as a compendium of the practice leading to enlightenment.")

Four establishments of mindfulness (cattāro satipaṭṭhānā)

1. Mindfulness of the body (kāyānupassanā, S. kayānupasthāna)
2. Mindfulness of feelings (vedanānupassanā, S. vedanānupasthāna)
3. Mindfulness of mental states (cittānupassanā, S. cittanupasthāna)
4. Mindfulness of mental qualities (dhammānupassanā, S. dharmanupasthāna)

Four right exertions/efforts (cattāro sammappadhānā)

1. Exertion for the preventing of unskillful states to arise
2. Exertion for the abandoning of the already arisen unskillful states
3. Exertion for the arising of skillful states
4. Exertion for the sustaining and increasing of arisen skillful states

Four bases of magical/mental/supernatural power (cattāro iddhipādā)

1. Will (chanda, S. chanda)
2. Energy, effort (viriya, S. vīrya)
3. Consciousness (citta, S. citta)
4. Examination (vīmaṁsa or vīmaŋsā, S. mimāṃsā)

Five spiritual faculties (pañca indriya)

1. Conviction (saddhā, S. śraddhā)
2. Energy, effort (viriya, s. vīrya)
3. Mindfulness (sati, S. smṛti)
4. Unification (samādhi, S. samādhi)
5. Wisdom (paññā, S. prajñā)

Five Strengths (pañca bala)

1. Conviction (saddhā, S. śraddhā)
2. Energy, effort (viriya, S. vīrya)
3. Mindfulness (sati, S. smṛti)
4. Unification (samādhi, S. samādhi)
5. Wisdom (paññā, S. prajñā)

Seven Factors of Awakening (bojjhanga)

1. Mindfulness (sati, S. smṛti)
2. Investigation (dhamma vicaya, S. dharmapravicaya)
3. Energy, effort (viriya, S. vīrya)
4. Joy (pīti, S. prīti)
5. Tranquillity (passaddhi, S. praśrabdhi)
6. Unification (samādhi, S. samādhi)
7. Equanimity (upekkhā, S. upekṣā)

Noble Eightfold Path

1. Right Understanding (sammā diṭṭhi, S. samyag-dṛṣṭi)
2. Right Intention (sammā saṅkappa, S. samyak-saṃkalpa)
3. Right Speech (sammā vācā, S. samyag-vāc)
4. Right Action (sammā kammanta, S. samyak-karmānta)
5. Right Livelihood (sammā ājīva, S. samyag-ājīva)
6. Right Effort (sammā vāyāma, S. samyag-vyāyāma)
7. Right Mindfulness (sammā sati, S. samyak-smṛti)
8. Right Unification (sammā samādhi, S. samyak-samādhi)

=== Developing the seven factors of awakening ===
According to Rupert Gethin, the Buddhist path to awakening is frequently summarized in the Pali Canon in a short formula as

abandoning the hindrances, practice of the four establishings of mindfulness, and development of the awakening factors.

Various practices lead to the development of the bojjhaṅgā, the seven factors of awakening, which are not only the means to, but also the constituents of awakening. According to Gethin, there is a "definite affinity" between the four jhanas and the bojjhaṅgā, the development of which is aided by a variety of meditation practices. Together with satipatthana (mindfulness) and anapanasati (breath-meditation), this results in a "heightened awareness," "overcoming distracting and disturbing emotions."

=== Alternate formulations ===
Other descriptions of Buddhist essentials can also be found.

==== Anupubbikathā ====
Another formula is anupubbikathā, "graduated talk, in which the Buddha talks on generosity (dāna), virtue (sīla), heaven (sagga), danger of sensual pleasure (kāmānaṃ ādīnava) (Note: In regards to translating ādīnava, Bullitt uses the word "drawbacks" while Ñāṇamoli & Bodhi (2001) use "danger" (p. 485), and Rhys Davids & Stede (1921–25) recommend "disadvantage, danger" (p. 99).) and renunciation (nekkhamma). When the listener is prepared by these topics, the Buddha then delivers "the teaching special to the Buddhas," the Four Noble Truths (cattāri ariya-saccāni), by which arises "the spotless immaculate vision of the Dhamma." In the Tibetan Lamrim teachings, the Bodhisattva-path, with its training of the six perfections, is added to this formula.

==== Atthakavagga ====
The Atthakavagga, one of the oldest books of the Sutta Pitaka, contained in the Sutta Nipata, does not give a clear-cut goal such as Nirvana, but describes the ideal person. This ideal person is especially characterized by suddhi (purity) and santi (calmness).

Commentaries on the Atthakavagga, namely the Mahaniddesa and the commentary by Buddhaghosa, show the development of Buddhist ideas over time. Both commentaries place the Atthakavagga in their frame of reference, giving an elaborated system of thought far more complicated than the Atthakavagga itself.

== Theravada tradition - Path of purification ==
The classical outline of the Theravada path to liberation are the Seven Purifications, as described by Buddhaghosa in the Visuddhimagga. These purifications are:

1. Purification of Conduct (sīla-visuddhi)
2. Purification of Mind (citta-visuddhi)
3. Purification of View (ditthi-visuddhi)
4. Purification by Overcoming Doubt (kankha-vitarana-visuddhi)
5. Purification by Knowledge and Vision of What Is Path and Not Path (maggamagga-ñanadassana-visuddhi)
6. Purification by Knowledge and Vision of the Course of Practice (patipada-ñanadassana-visuddhi)
  1. Knowledge of contemplation of rise and fall (udayabbayanupassana-nana)
  2. Knowledge of contemplation of dissolution (bhanganupassana-nana)
  3. Knowledge of appearance as terror (bhayatupatthana-nana)
  4. Knowledge of contemplation of danger (adinavanupassana-nana)
  5. Knowledge of contemplation of dispassion (nibbidanupassana-nana)
  6. Knowledge of desire for deliverance (muncitukamyata-nana)
  7. Knowledge of contemplation of reflection (patisankhanupassana-nana)
  8. Knowledge of equanimity about formations (sankharupekka-nana)
  9. Conformity knowledge (anuloma-nana)
7. Purification by Knowledge and Vision (ñanadassana-visuddhi)
  1. Change of lineage
  2. The first path and fruit
  3. The second path and fruit
  4. The third path and fruit
  5. The fourth path and fruit

The "Purification by Knowledge and Vision" is the culmination of the practice, in four stages leading to liberation.

The emphasis in this system is on understanding the three marks of existence, dukkha, anatta, anicca. This emphasis is recognizable in the value that is given to vipassana over samatha, especially in the contemporary vipassana movement.

== Sarvastivada tradition ==
The Sarvāstivāda Vaibhāṣika school developed an influential outline of the path to awakening, one which was later adapted and modified by the scholars of the Mahayana tradition. This was called the "five paths" (pañcamārga), and can be seen in their Abhidharma texts as well as Vasubadhu's Abhidharmakośa (AKBh).

The five paths are:

1. Mokṣa-bhāgīya (The state leading up to release) or Saṃbhāra-mārga (path of accumulation). According to Vasubandhu, this entails morality, learning the teaching and the practice of the four foundations of mindfulness.
2. Nirveda-bhāgīya (The state leading up to penetration) or Prayoga-mārga (The path of preparation). Vasubandhu's AKBh says that here one observes the four noble truths in terms of its sixteen aspects.
3. Darśana-mārga (The path of seeing or insight). According to the AKBh, in this path one continues to observe the four noble truths until one realizes it and abandons eighty eight afflictions (kleshas).
4. Bhāvanā-mārga, (The path of cultivation). According to the AKBh, in this stage, one continues to practice and abandons 10 further kleshas.
5. Aśaikṣā-mārga (The path of no more learning or consummation). One is fully freed of all obstructions and afflictions and are thus perfected or fulfilled (niṣṭhā).

== Bodhisattva path ==
Mahāyāna Buddhism is based principally upon the path of a bodhisattva. Mahāyāna Buddhism encourages everyone to become bodhisattvas and to take the bodhisattva vows. With these vows, one makes the promise to work for the complete enlightenment of all sentient beings by following the bodhisattva path. The path can be described in terms of the six perfections or in terms of the five paths and ten bhumis.

=== Six paramitas ===
The six paramitas are the means by which Mahayana practitioners actualize their aspiration to attain complete enlightenment for the benefit of all. In Mahāyāna Buddhism, the Prajñapāramitā Sūtras, the Lotus Sutra (Skt., Saddharma Puṇḍarīka Sūtra), and a large number of other texts, list the six perfections as follows:

1. Dāna pāramitā: generosity, the attitude of giving
2. Śīla pāramitā : virtue, morality, discipline, proper conduct
3. Kṣānti (kshanti) pāramitā : patience, tolerance, forbearance, acceptance, endurance
4. Vīrya pāramitā : energy, diligence, vigor, effort
5. Dhyāna pāramitā : one-pointed concentration, contemplation
6. Prajñā pāramitā : wisdom, insight

=== Five paths and ten bhumis ===
==== Five paths ====
The Mahayana commentary the Abhisamayalamkara presents a progressive formula of five paths (pañcamārga, Wylie Tibetan lam lnga) adopted from the Sarvastivada tradition's Abhidharma exposition. The Five Paths as taught in the Mahayana are:

1. The path of accumulation (saṃbhāra-mārga, Wylie Tibetan: tshogs lam). Persons on this Path:
  1. Possess a strong desire to overcome suffering, either their own or others;
  2. Renunciate the worldly life.
2. The path of preparation or application (prayoga-mārga, Wylie Tibetan: sbyor lam). Persons on this Path:
  1. Start practicing meditation;
  2. Have analytical knowledge of emptiness.
3. The path of seeing (darśana-mārga, Wylie Tibetan: mthong lam) (Bhūmi 1). Persons on this Path:
  1. Practice profound concentration meditation on the nature of reality;
  2. Realize the emptiness of reality.
  3. Corresponds to "stream-entry" and the first Bodhisattva Bhumi.
4. The path of meditation (bhāvanā-mārga, Wylie Tibetan: sgom lam) (Bhūmi 2–7). Persons on this path purify themselves and accumulate wisdom.
5. The path of no more learning or consummation (aśaikṣā-mārga, Wylie Tibetan: mi slob pa'I lam or thar phyin pa'i lam) (Bhūmi 8–10). Persons on this Path have completely purified themselves.

==== Ten Bhumis ====
The "bodhisattva bhūmis" ("enlightenment-being grounds/levels") are subcategories of the Five Paths. The Sanskrit term bhūmi literally means "ground" or "foundation", since each stage represents a level of attainment and serves as a basis for the next one. Each level marks a definite advancement in one's training that is accompanied by progressively greater power and wisdom. The Avatamsaka Sutra refers to the following ten bhūmis:

1. The Very Joyous (Skt. Paramudita), in which one rejoices at realizing a partial aspect of the truth;
2. The Stainless (Skt. Vimala), in which one is free from all defilement;
3. The Luminous (Skt. Prabhakari), in which one radiates the light of wisdom;
4. The Radiant (Skt. Archishmati), in which the radiant flame of wisdom burns away earthly desires;
5. The Difficult to Cultivate (Skt. Sudurjaya), in which one surmounts the illusions of darkness, or ignorance as the Middle Way;
6. The Manifest (Skt. Abhimukhi) in which supreme wisdom begins to manifest;
7. The Gone Afar (Skt. Duramgama), in which one rises above the states of the Two vehicles;
8. The Immovable (Skt. Achala), in which one dwells firmly in the truth of the Middle Way and cannot be perturbed by anything;
9. The Good Intelligence (Skt. Sadhumati), in which one preaches the Law freely and without restriction;
10. The Cloud of Doctrine (Skt. Dharmamegha), in which one benefits all sentient beings with the Law (Dharma), just as a cloud sends down rain impartially on all things.

== Tibetan Buddhism ==
=== Lam Rim ===
Lam Rim describes the stages of the path. Tsong Khapa mentions three essential elements:

- The aspiration for awakening
- Bodhicitta, the aspiration to attain this for all living beings
- Insight into emptiness

=== Annuttara-yoga tantras ===
In the highest class of tantra, two stages of practice are distinguished, namely generation and completion. In some Buddhist tantras, both stages can be practiced simultaneously, whereas in others, one first actualizes the generation stage before continuing with the completion stage practices.

==== Generation stage ====
In the first stage of generation, one engages in deity yoga. One practices oneself in the identification with the meditational Buddha or deity (yidam) by visualisations, until one can meditate single-pointedly on being the deity. (Note: A comparison may be made with the "Role theory" of Hjalmar Sundén, which describes how identification with a religious figure can lead to conversion. See (in Dutch) N. Hijweege (1994, Bekering in de gereformeerde gezindte, which describes how the story of Paulus conversion on the road to Damascus serves as an example of the "ideal-conversion" in orthodox Protestant churches.)

==== Four purities ====
In the generation stage of Deity Yoga, the practitioner visualizes the "Four Purities" (Tibetan: yongs su dag pa bzhi; yongs dag bzhi) which define the principal Tantric methodology of Deity Yoga that distinguishes it from the rest of Buddhism:

1. Seeing one's body as the body of the deity
2. Seeing one's environment as the pure land or mandala of the deity
3. Perceiving one's enjoyments as bliss of the deity, free from attachment
4. Performing one's actions only for the benefit of others (bodhichitta motivation, altruism) (Note: Kalachakranet (2006), Tantric Practice (Source: January 3, 2008))

==== Completion stage ====
In the next stage of completion, the practitioner can use either the path of method (thabs lam) or the path of liberation ('grol lam).

At the path of method the practitioner engages in Kundalini yoga practices. These involve the subtle energy system of the body of the chakras and the energy channels. The "wind energy" is directed and dissolved into the heart chakra, where-after the Mahamudra remains, and the practitioner is physically and mentally transformed.

At the path of liberation the practitioner applies mindfulness, a preparatory practice for Mahamudra or Dzogchen, to realize the inherent emptiness of every-'thing' that exists.

=== Four yogas of mahāmudrā ===
Mahāmudrā' literally means "great seal" or "great symbol". The name refers to the way one who has realized mahāmudrā. "Mudra" refers to the fact that each phenomenon appears vividly, and "maha" refers to the fact that it is beyond concept, imagination, and projection.

Mahāmudrā is sometimes divided into four distinct phases known as the four yogas of mahāmudrā. They are as follows:

1. One-pointedness;
2. Simplicity, "free from complexity" or "not elaborate";
3. One taste;
4. Non-meditation, the state of not holding to either an object of meditation nor to a meditator. Nothing further needs to be 'meditated upon' or 'cultivated at this stage.

These stages parallel the four yogas of dzogchen semde. The four yogas of Mahāmudrā have also been correlated with the Mahāyāna five Bhumi paths.

== Zen ==
Although the Rinzai Zen-tradition emphasises sudden awakening over the study of scripture, in practice several stages can be distinguished. A well-known example are the Ten Ox-Herding Pictures which detail the steps on the Path.

=== Two Entrances and Four Practices ===
The Long Scroll of the Treatise on the Two Entrances and Four Practices, attributed to Bodhidharma, refers the entrance of principle (理入 lǐrù) and the entrance of practice (行入 xíngrù). (Note: "principle" is also translated as "reason.")

- "Entrance of principle" refers to seeing through the obscurations of our daily mind and manifesting our true nature, that is, Buddha nature; it is referred to in one short passage:

To enter by principle means to realize the essence through instruction and to believe that all living things share the same true nature, which isn't apparent because it's shrouded by sensation and delusion. Those who turn from delusion back to reality, who "meditate on walls," the absence of self and other, the oneness of mortal and sage, and who remain unmoved even by scriptures, are in complete and unspoken agreement with principle. Without moving, without effort, they enter, we say, by principle.

- "Entrance of practice" deals with practicing a "detached perspective on the varying circumstances of one's own life," through different daily practices. In the section on the latter, the four practices are listed as being at the core of Bodhidharma's teaching. These are:
  - Practice of the retribution of enmity: to accept all suffering as the fruition of past transgressions, without enmity or complaint.
  - Practice of the acceptance of circumstances: to remain unmoved even by good fortune, recognizing it as evanescent.
  - Practice of the absence of craving: to be without craving, which is the source of all suffering.
  - Practice of accordance with the Dharma: to eradicate wrong thoughts and practice the six perfections, without having any "practice"

According to John R. McRae, "the "entrance of principle" refers to interior cultivation, mental practice undertaken deep within the individual's psyche, and the "entrance of practice" refers to practice undertaken actively and in interaction with the world." Yet, McRae also notes that it's not clear what exactly the "entrance of principle" entailed. The phrase "wall contemplation," biguan, is not explicated. Later tradition graphically depicted it as practicing dhyana while facing a wall, but it may be a metaphor, referring to the four walls of a room which prevent the winds from entering the room.

=== Sudden and gradual ===
In the 8th century the distinction became part of a struggle for influence at the Chinese court by Shenhui, a student of Huineng. Hereafter "sudden enlightenment" became one of the hallmarks of Chan Buddhism, though the sharp distinction was softened by subsequent generations of practitioners. Once the dichotomy between sudden and gradual was in place, it defined its own logic and rhetorics, which are also recognizable in the distinction between Caodong (Soto) and Lin-ji (Rinzai) chán. But it also led to a "sometimes bitter and always prolix sectarian controversy between later Chán and Hua-yen exegetes".

In the Huayan classification of teachings, the sudden approach was regarded inferior to the Perfect Teaching of Hua-yen. Guifeng Zongmi, fifth patriarch of Hua-yen ànd Chán-master, devised his own classification to counter this subordination. Guifeng Zongmi also softened the edge between sudden and gradual. In his analysis, sudden awakening points to seeing into one's true nature, but is to be followed by a gradual cultivation to attain Buddhahood. Chinul, a 12th-century Korean Seon master, followed Zongmi, and also emphasized that insight into our true nature is sudden, but is to be followed by practice to ripen the insight and attain full Buddhahood. To establish the superiority of the Chán-teachings, Chinul explained the sudden approach as not pointing to mere emptiness, but to suchness or the dharmadhatu.

This is also the standpoint of the contemporary Sanbo Kyodan, according to whom kensho is at the start of the path to full enlightenment. This gradual cultivation is described by Chan Master Sheng Yen as follows:

Ch'an expressions refer to enlightenment as "seeing your self-nature". But even this is not enough. After seeing your self-nature, you need to deepen your experience even further and bring it into maturation. You should have enlightenment experience again and again and support them with continuous practice. Even though Ch'an says that at the time of enlightenment, your outlook is the same as of the Buddha, you are not yet a full Buddha.

==== Rinzai-Zen ====
In Rinzai, insight into true nature is to be followed by gradual cultivation. This is described in teachings such as the Three Mysterious Gates of Linji, and the Four Ways of Knowing of Hakuin.

==== Sōtō-Zen ====
Although Sōtō emphasizes shikan-taza, just-sitting, this tradition too had description of development within the practice. This is described by Tozan, who described the Five ranks of enlightenment.

== See also ==
- Four Noble Truths
- Index of Buddhism-related articles
- Mushi-dokugo
- Noble Eightfold Path
- Samatha & Vipassanā
- Secular Buddhism

== Sources ==
=== Printed sources ===
- Arbel, Keren (2016), Early Buddhist Meditation: The Four Jhanas as the Actualization of Insight, Routledge, doi:10.4324/9781315676043, ISBN 9781317383994
- Arbel, Keren (2017), Early Buddhist Meditation: The Four Jhanas as the Actualization of Insight, Taylor & Francis, doi:10.4324/9781315676043, ISBN 9781317383994
- Berzin, Alexander (2006), Primary Minds and the 51 Mental Factors
- Bucknell, Rod (1984), "The Buddhist Path to Liberation: An Analysis of the Listing of Stages", The Journal of the International Association of Buddhist Studies, 7 (2)
- Bodhi, Bhikkhu (2011), The Noble Eightfold Path: Way to the End of Suffering, Independent Publishers Group, Kindle Edition
- Bucknell, Robert S. (1993), "Reinterpreting the Jhanas", Journal of the International Association of Buddhist Studies, 16 (2)
- Burford, Grace G. (1994), "Theravada Buddhist Soteriology and the Paradox of Desire", in Buswell, Robert E. (ed.), Paths to Liberation. The Marga and its Transformations in Buddhist Thought, Delhi: Motilal Banarsidass Publishers
- Buswell, Robert E. (1991), "The "Short-cut" Approach of K'an-hua Meditation: The Evolution of a Practical Subitism in Chinese Ch'an Buddhism.", in Gregory, Peter N. (ed.), Sudden and Gradual. Approaches to Enlightenment in Chinese Thought, Delhi: Motilal Banarsidass Publishers Private Limited
- Buswell, Robert E (1993), Ch'an Hermeneutics: A Korean View. In: Donald S. Lopez, Jr. (ed.)(1993), Buddhist Hermeneutics, Delhi: Motilal Banarsidass
- Buswell, Robert E. JR; Gimello, Robert M., eds. (1994), Paths to Liberation. The Marga and its Transformations in Buddhist Thought, Delhi: Motilal Banarsidass Publishers
- Chen, Naichen (2017), The Great Prajna Paramita Sutra, Volume 1, Wheatmark
- Fuller-Sasaki, Ruth (2008), The Record of Lin-Ji, University of Hawaii Press
- Geshe Tashi Tsering (2005), The Four Noble Truths: The Foundation of Buddhist Thought, Volume I, Wisdom, Kindle Edition
- Gethin, Rupert (1998), Foundations of Buddhism, Oxford University Press
- Gethin, R.M.L. (2001) [1992], The Buddhist Path to Awakening, Oneworld Publications, ISBN 978-1851682850
- Gethin, Rupert (2004), On the practice of Buddhist meditation according to the Pali Nikāyas and exegetical sources (PDF), University of Hamburg
- Goldstein, Joseph (2011), One Dharma: The Emerging Western Buddhism, Harper Collins, Kindle Edition
- Gregory, Peter N. (1991), Sudden Enlightenment Followed by Gradual Cultivation: Tsung-mi's Analysis of mind. In: Peter N. Gregory (editor)(1991), Sudden and Gradual. Approaches to Enlightenment in Chinese Thought, Delhi: Motilal Banarsidass Publishers Private Limited
- Guenther, Herbert V.; Kawamura, Leslie S. (1975), Mind in Buddhist Psychology: A Translation of Ye-shes rgyal-mtshan's "The Necklace of Clear Understanding" (Kindle ed.), Dharma Publishing
- Gunaratana, Henepola (1994), The Path of Serenity and Insight, Delhi: Motilal Banarsidass Publishers Private Limited
- Harding, Sarah (1996), Creation and Completion - Essential Points of Tantric Meditation, Boston: Wisdom Publications
- Johansson, Rune Edvin Anders (1981), Pali Buddhist Texts: Explained to the Beginner, Psychology Press
- Kapleau, Philip (1989), The three pillars of Zen
- Kasulis, Thomas P. (2003), Ch'an Spirituality. In: Buddhist Spirituality. Later China, Korea, Japan and the Modern World; edited by Takeuchi Yoshinori, Delhi: Motilal Banarsidass
- Kuan, Tse-Fu (2005). "CLARIFICATION ON FEELINGS IN BUDDHIST "DHYĀNA/JHĀNA" MEDITATION". Journal of Indian Philosophy, June 2005, Vol. 33, No. 3 (June 2005), pp. 285-319.
- Kunsang, Erik Pema (2004), Gateway to Knowledge, Vol. 1, North Atlantic Books
- Low, Albert (2006), Hakuin on Kensho. The Four Ways of Knowing, Boston & London: Shambhala
- Lusthaus, Dan (2002), Buddhist Phenomenology: A Philosophical Investigation of Yogacara Buddhism and the Ch'eng Wei-shih Lun, Routledge
- Maezumi, Taizan; Cook, Francis Dojun (2007), "The Eight Awarenesses of the Enlightened Person": Dogen Zenji's Hachidainingaku", in Maezumi, Taizan; Glassman, Bernie (eds.), The Hazy Moon of Enlightenment, Wisdom Publications
- McRae, John (2003), Seeing Through Zen, The University Press Group Ltd
- Namgyal, Dakpo Tashi (2006), Mahamudra: The Moonlight: Quintessence of Mind and Meditation, Wisdom Publications
- The Zen Teaching of Bodhidharma, translated by Red Pine, 2009
- Polak, Grzegorz (2011), Reexamining Jhana: Towards a Critical Reconstruction of Early Buddhist Soteriology, UMCS
- Ray, Reginald (2001), Secret of the Vajra World, Shambhala
- Rhys-Davids, T.W.; Stede, William, eds. (1921–25), The Pali Text Society's Pali–English dictionary, Pali Text Society)
- Ringu Tulku (2005), Daring Steps Toward Fearlessness: The Three Vehicles of Tibetan Buddhism, Snow Lion
- Sangpo, Gelong Lodro; Dhammajoti, Bhikkhu K.L. (2012), Abhidharmakosa-Bhasya of Vasubandhu: Volume 3, Motilal Banarsidass
- Sarbacker, Stuart Ray (2021), Tracing the Path of Yoga: The History and Philosophy of Indian Mind-Body Discipline, State University of New York Press
- Smith, Huston; Novak, Philip (2009), Buddhism: A Concise Introduction, HarperOne, Kindle Edition
- Snelling, John (1987), The Buddhist handbook. A Complete Guide to Buddhist Teaching and Practice, London: Century Paperbacks
- Stuart-Fox, Martin (1989), "Jhana and Buddhist Scholasticism", Journal of the International Association of Buddhist Studies, 12 (2)
- Sucitto, Ajahn (2010), Turning the Wheel of Truth: Commentary on the Buddha's First Teaching, Shambhala
- Sujato, Bhante (2012), A History of Mindfulness (PDF), Santipada, ISBN 9781921842108
- Sutra Translation Committee of the United States and Canada (1998), The Seeker's Glossary of Buddhism (PDF), archived from the original (PDF) on 2013-04-30
- Traleg Kyabgon (2001), The Essence of Buddhism, Shambhala
- Tsong Khapa (2003), Drie hoofdzaken van het pad, Maitreya Uitgeverij
- Vetter, Tilmann (1988), The Ideas and Meditative Practices of Early Buddhism, BRILL
- Watanabe, Chikafumi (2000). A Study of Mahayanasamgraha III: The Relation of Practical Theories and Philosophical Theories (Ph.D. dissertation). The University of Calgary.
- Wayman, Alex (1997), "Introduction", Calming the Mind and Discerning the Real: Buddhist Meditation and the Middle View, from the Lam Rim Chen Mo Tson-kha-pa, Motilal Banarsidass Publishers
- Williams, Paul (2002), Buddhist Thought, Taylor & Francis, Kindle Edition
- Yen, Chan Master Sheng (1996), Dharma Drum: The Life and Heart of Ch'an Practice, Boston & London: Shambhala
- Yuthok, Choedak (1997), Lamdre: Dawn of Enlightenment. (PDF), Canberra, Australia: Gorum Publications, ISBN 0-9587085-0-9, archived from the original (PDF) on 2013-02-01
