= Bodhipakkhiyādhammā =

Spiritual qualities conducive to Buddhist cultivation

In Buddhism, the bodhipakkhiyā dhammā (Pali; variant spellings include bodhipakkhikā dhammā and bodhapakkhiyā dhammā; Skt.: bodhipakṣa dharma) are qualities (dhammā) conducive or related to (pakkhiya) awakening/understanding (bodhi), i.e. the factors and wholesome qualities which are developed when the mind is trained (bhavana).

In the Pali commentaries, the term bodhipakkhiyā dhammā is used to refer to seven sets of such qualities regularly attributed to the Buddha throughout the Pali Canon. Within these seven sets of bodhi-related qualities, there is listed a total of thirty-seven repetitious and interrelated qualities (sattatiṃsa bodhipakkhiyā dhammā).

These seven sets of qualities are recognized by both Theravāda and Mahāyāna Buddhists as complementary facets of the Buddhist path to bodhi.

== Seven sets of thirty-seven qualities ==
In the Pali Canon's Bhāvanānuyutta sutta ("Mental Development Discourse," (Note: The Pali word translated here as "development" is bhāvanā. Nyanaponika & Bodhi (1999), p. 305 n. 20 note: "The term 'bhāvanā' (lit.:making become), usually translated as 'meditation,' is not restricted to methodical exercises in mental concentration but comprises the entire field of mental training." For elaboration on this point, compare the Wikipedia articles Bhavana, Buddhist meditation (regarding "mediation" and "mental concentration"), and Threefold training (regarding "mental training").) AN 7.67), the Buddha is recorded as saying:

Monks, although a monk who does not apply himself to the meditative development of his mind [bhavana] may wish, "Oh, that my mind might be free from the taints by non-clinging!", yet his mind will not be freed. For what reason? "Because he has not developed his mind," one has to say. Not developed it in what? In the four foundations of mindfulness, the four right kinds of striving, the four bases of success, the five spiritual faculties, the five spiritual powers, the seven factors of enlightenment and the Noble Eightfold Path. (Note: Regarding the ordering of the seven sets, Bodhi (2000), pp. 1486–87, notes: "The presentation of the seven sets in a graded sequence might convey the impression that they constitute seven successive stages of practice. This, however, would be a misinterpretation. Close consideration of the series would show that the seven sets are ranked in a numerically ascending order, from four to eight, which means that their arrangement is purely pedagogic and implies nothing about a later set being more advanced than the earlier sets.... By presenting the course of practice from different angles, in different keys, and with different degrees of detail, the texts are able to finely modulate the practice of the path to suit the diverse needs of the people to be trained....")

Elsewhere in the Canon, and in numerous places in the āgamas of other early schools, these seven sets of thirty-seven qualities conducive to Enlightenment are enumerated as:

=== Four establishments/presences of mindfulness (cattāro satipaṭṭhānā) ===
1. Mindfulness of the body (kāyānupassanā, S. kayānupasthāna)
2. Mindfulness of feelings (vedanānupassanā, S. vedanānupasthāna)
3. Mindfulness of mental states (cittānupassanā, S. cittanupasthāna)
4. Mindfulness of mental qualities (dhammānupassanā, S. dharmanupasthāna)

=== Four right exertions/efforts/strivings (cattāro sammappadhānā) ===
1. Effort for the preventing of unskillful states to arise [anuppādāya]
2. Effort for the abandoning of the already arisen unskillful states [pahānāya]
3. Effort for the arising of skillful states [uppādāya]
4. Effort for the sustaining and increasing of arisen skillful states [ṭhitiyā]

=== Four bases of spiritual power (cattāro iddhipādā) ===
1. Intention or will (chanda, S. chanda)
2. Effort (viriya, S. vīrya)
3. Consciousness (citta, S. citta)
4. Skill of Analysis (vīmaṁsa or vīmaŋsā, S. mimāṃsā)

=== Five spiritual faculties (pañca indriya) ===
1. Conviction (saddhā, S. śraddhā)
2. Effort (viriya, S. vīrya)
3. Mindfulness (sati, S. smṛti)
4. Concentration/Unification (samādhi, S. samādhi)
5. Wisdom (paññā, S. prajñā)

=== Five Strengths (pañca bala) ===
1. Conviction (saddhā, S. śraddhā})
2. Effort (viriya, S. vīrya)
3. Mindfulness (sati, S. smṛti)
4. Concentration/Unification (samādhi, S. samādhi)
5. Wisdom (paññā, S. prajñā)

=== Seven Factors of bodhi (awakening, understanding) (satta bojjhaṅgā) ===
1. Mindfulness (sati, S. smṛti)
2. Investigation (dhamma vicaya, S. dharmapravicaya)
3. Effort (viriya, S. vīrya)
4. Joy (pīti, S. prīti)
5. Tranquillity (passaddhi, S. praśrabdhi)
6. Concentration/Unification (samādhi, S. samādhi)
7. Equanimity (upekkhā, S. upekṣā)

=== Noble Eightfold Path (ariya aṭṭhaṅgika magga) ===
1. Right Understanding (sammā diṭṭhi, S. samyag-dṛṣṭi)
2. Right Intention (sammā saṅkappa, S. samyak-saṃkalpa)
3. Right Speech (sammā vācā, S. samyag-vāc)
4. Right Action (sammā kammanta, S. samyak-karmānta)
5. Right Livelihood (sammā ājīva, S. samyag-ājīva)
6. Right Effort/Energy (sammā vāyāma, S. samyag-vyāyāma)
7. Right Mindfulness (sammā sati, S. samyak-smṛti)
8. Right Concentration/Unification (sammā samādhi, S. samyak-samādhi)

== Forty-three and forty-one qualities ==
In the Pali Canon's Nettipakaraṇa (Netti 112) forty-three qualities connected with awakening (tecattālīsa bodhipakkhiyā dhammā) are mentioned which, according to the commentaries, include the aforementioned thirty-seven plus the following six contemplations (also found in the suttas, e.g. Saṅgīti Sutta D iii 251)

- The contemplation of the three marks of existence:
1. impermanence (aniccasaññā)
2. suffering (dukkhasaññā)
3. non-self (anattasaññā)
- abandoning (pahānasaññā)
- dispassion (virāgasaññā)
- cessation (nirodhasaññā)

A sutta found in The Senior Collection of Gandhāran Buddhist texts ascribes forty one instead of thirty seven beneficial dharmas. The Gandharan text includes rūpajhānas which the Pali tradition does not. Salomon notes this forty one numbered list appears in both a Chinese translation of the Dirghagama which current scholarship believes to be of the Dharmaguptaka school of Buddhism and a Chinese translation of the Dharmaguptaka vinaya.

== In the Pali literature ==
The technical term, bodhipakkhiyā dhammā, explicitly referring to the seven sets of qualities identified above, is first encountered in the Pali commentaries; nonetheless, the seven sets of bodhipakkhiya dhammas are themselves first collated, enumerated, and referenced in the Sutta Pitaka and Abhidhamma Pitaka.

=== Sutta Pitaka ===
In the Digha Nikāya's famed Maha-parinibbana Sutta (DN 16), which recounts the Buddha's last days, in the Buddha's last address to his assembly of followers he states:

Now, O bhikkhus, I say to you that these teachings of which I have direct knowledge and which I have made known to you—these you should thoroughly learn, cultivate, develop, and frequently practice, that the life of purity may be established and may long endure, for the welfare and happiness of the multitude, out of compassion for the world, for the benefit, well being, and happiness of gods and men. And what, bhikkhus, are these teachings? They are the four foundations of mindfulness, the four right efforts, the four constituents of psychic power, the five faculties, the five powers, the seven factors of enlightenment, and the Noble Eightfold Path. These, bhikkhus, are the teachings of which I have direct knowledge, which I have made known to you, and which you should thoroughly learn, cultivate, develop, and frequently practice....

In the Majjhima Nikāya's "Greater Discourse to Sakuludāyin" (MN 77), when asked why his disciples venerated him, the Buddha identified five qualities he possessed: highest virtues (adhisīle ... paramena sīlakkhandha); highest knowledge and vision (abhikkante ñāṇadassane); highest wisdom (adhipaññāya ... paramena paññākkhandha); his explanation of the Four Noble Truths (ariyasaccāni); and, his identification of numerous ways to develop wholesome states. The Buddha's elaboration of the last item includes the seven sets of thirty-seven bodhipakkhiyā dhammas which are enumerated individually in this discourse. These are absent from a parallel to this discourse extant in the Madhyama Āgama.

In the Samyutta Nikāya, the fifth division's first seven chapters are each devoted to one of the bodhipakkhiya dhammas. While there is a great deal of repetition among these chapters' discourses, these seven chapters include almost 900 discourses.

In the Anguttara Nikāya's "Upajjhāyasutta" (AN 5.6.6), the Buddha recommends five things for a monk to overcome spiritual hindrances: control mental faculties; eat the right amount of food; maintain wakefulness; be aware of merit; and, develop the bodhipakkhiya dhammas throughout the day.

In the Khuddaka Nikāya, the bodhipakkhiya dhammas are mentioned at Iti. 82, Th. 900, and Nett. 31, 112, 197, 237, 240 and 261.

=== Abhidhamma Pitaka ===
The bodhipakkhiyā dhammā are mentioned in several passages of the Abhidhamma, such as at Vbh. sections 571 and 584.

=== Commentaries and treatises ===
==== Commentaries ====
In terms of Pali commentaries, the bodhipakkhiyā dhammā are also mentioned in Dhammapada-Aṭṭhakathā (DhA i.230), Suttanipāta-Aṭṭhakathā (SnA 164), and Jātaka-Aṭṭhakathā (J i.275, iii.290, and v.483).

==== Treatises ====
In the Visuddhimagga, Buddhaghosa enumerates the seven sets of bodhipakkhiya dhammas along with a relevant Sutta Pitaka discourse (Vism. XXII.33), describes each set (Vism. XXII.34-38), and describes their existence in the consciousness of an arahant (Vism. XXII.39-40). In addition, Buddhaghosa factors the 37 qualities in a manner so as to describe fourteen non-redundant qualities (Vism. XXII.40-43); thus, for instance, while nine qualities (zeal, consciousness, joy, tranquility, equanimity, intention, speech, action, livelihood) are mentioned only once in the full list of 37 qualities, the other five qualities are mentioned multiple times. Table 1 below identifies the five qualities spanning multiple bodhipakkhiyā-dhamma sets.

		7 SETS OF QUALITIES						
		4 Establishments of Mindfulness	4 Right Exertions	4 Bases of Power	5 Faculties	5 Powers	7 Factors of Awakening	Noble Eightfold Path
5 Q U A L I T I E S	Faith				saddhā	saddhā		
5 Q U A L I T I E S	Energy		4 sammā- padhāna	viriya	viriya	viriya	viriya	sammā vāyāma
5 Q U A L I T I E S	Mindfulness	4 sati- paṭṭhānā			sati	sati	sati	sammā sati
5 Q U A L I T I E S	Concentration				samādhi	samādhi	samādhi	sammā samādhi
5 Q U A L I T I E S	Wisdom			vīmaṁsa	paññā	paññā	dhammā vicaya	sammā ditthi
Table 1: Five qualities mentioned 28 times across seven sets of qualities conducive to Enlightenment (based on Vism. XXII.41-43).

== See also ==
- Basic Points Unifying the Theravada and the Mahayana – Buddhist ecumenical statement in 1967
- Bojjhanga – Spiritual qualities for Buddhist Awakening
- Five Strengths – Buddhist philosophical concept
- Four Noble Truths – Formulaic summary of Buddhist doctrines
- Four Right Exertions – Buddhist philosophical concept
- Index of Buddhism-related articles – Alphabetical listing of Buddhism related topics
- Satipatthana – Mindfulness in Buddhism
- Secular Buddhism – Form of Buddhism without supernatural content
- Three marks of existence – Buddhist concept: impermanence, suffering, and non-self
- Threefold Training – Buddhist practices for higher virtue, mind, and wisdom

== Sources ==
- Bodhi, Bhikkhu (2000), The Connected Discourses of the Buddha: A Translation of the Samyutta Nikaya, Wisdom Publications, ISBN 0-86171-331-1
- Buddhaghosa, Bhadantacariya & Bhikkhu Ñāṇamoli (trans.) (1999). The Path of Purification: Visuddhimagga. Seattle: BPS Pariyatti Editions. ISBN 1-928706-00-2.
- Gethin, R.M.L. (2001), The Buddhist Path to Awakening: A Study of the Bodhi-Pakkhiyā Dhammā, Oneworld Publishers, ISBN 978-1851682850 (Cited in Bodhi, 2000, p. 1937 n. 235.)
- Ireland, John D. (1997), The Udāna & the Itivuttaka, Buddhist Publication Society, ISBN 955-24-0164-X
- Bhikkhu, Nanamoli; Bodhi, Bhikkhu (2001), The Middle-Length Discourses of the Buddha: A Translation of the Majjhima Nikāya, Wisdom Publications, ISBN 0-86171-072-X
- Norman, K.R. (1997), Poems of Early Buddhist Monks (Theragāthā), Pali Text Society, ISBN 0-86013-339-7
- Thera, Nyanaponika; Bodhi, Bhikkhu (1999), Numerical Discourses of the Buddha: An Anthology of Suttas from the Anguttara Nikaya, Altamira Press, ISBN 0-7425-0405-0
- Rahula, Walpola (2003), The Heritage of the Bhikkhu, Grove Press, ISBN 0-8021-4023-8 Cited on http://www.serve.com/cmtan/buddhism/Misc/unify.html Archived 2014-11-04 at the Wayback Machine; retrieved on 2007-05-22 .
- Rhys Davids, T.W.; Stede, William (1921), The Pali Text Society's Pali–English Dictionary, Pali Text Society A general on-line search engine for the PED is available at http://dsal.uchicago.edu/dictionaries/pali/.
- Sri Lanka Tripitaka Project (SLTP) (n.d.-a). Jhānavibhaṅgo (Vbh. ch. 12, in Pali). Retrieved on 2007-05-24 from "METTANET - LANKA" at: https://web.archive.org/web/20060109215754/http://www.metta.lk/tipitaka/3Abhidhamma-Pitaka/2-Vibhanga/12-jhanavibhanga-p.htm.
- Sri Lanka Tripitaka Project (SLTP) (n.d.-b). Mahā-sakuludāyisuttaṃ (MN 77, in Pali). Retrieved on 2007-05-22 from "METTANET - LANKA" at: https://web.archive.org/web/20160322070126/http://metta.lk/tipitaka/2Sutta-Pitaka/2Majjhima-Nikaya/Majjhima2/077-mahasakuludayi-p.html.
- Sri Lanka Tripitaka Project (SLTP) (n.d.-c). Vīsati-nipāto (Th ch. 20, gathas 705-948, in Pali). Retrieved on 2007-05-24 from "METTANET - LANKA" at: https://web.archive.org/web/20101125073300/http://metta.lk/tipitaka/2Sutta-Pitaka/5Khuddaka-Nikaya/08Theragatha/20-Satti-nipatha-p.html.
- Bhikkhu, Thanissaro (2001), The Group of Threes (Itivuttaka 50-99), Access to Insight
- Upalavanna, Sister (trans.) (n.d.-a), Mahā-sakuludāyisuttaṃ: Advice to the wandering Ascetic Sakuludayi (MN 77), METTANET - LANKA, archived from the original on 2016-03-22
- Upalavanna, Sister (trans.) (n.d.-a), Nīvaranavaggo – On obstacles (AN 5.6), METTANET - LANKA
- Vajira, Sister; Story, Francis (1998), Maha-parinibbana Sutta: Last Days of the Buddha (DN 10), Access to Insight
- Walshe, Maurice (1995), The Long Discourses of the Buddha: A Translation of the Dīgha Nikāya, Wisdom Publications, ISBN 0-86171-103-3
