= Vibhaṅga =

Buddhist scripture, part of the Pali Canon of Theravada Buddhism

- SuttaCentral; OpenTipitaka
- Type: Canonical text
- Parent: Abhidhamma Piṭaka
- Attribution: Bhāṇaka
- Aṭṭhakathā: Sammohavinodanī (Vibhaṅga-aṭṭhakathā)
- Commentator: Buddhaghosa
- Ṭīkā: Vibhaṅgamūlaṭīkā; Vibhaṅga-anuṭīkā
- Abbreviation: Vb; Vibh

The Vibhaṅga (Vietnamese: Bộ Phân Tích) is a Buddhist scripture, part of the Pali Canon of Theravada Buddhism, where it is included in the Abhidhamma Pitaka. One known English translation is contained in The Book of Analysis, first published in 1969.

The book has eighteen chapters, and each deals with a particular topic:

1. aggregate (khandha)
2. sense bases (āyatana)
3. elements (dhātu)
4. truth (sacca)
5. faculties (indriya)
6. dependent origination (paticcasamuppāda)
7. mindfulness foundation (satipaṭṭhāna)
8. right exertion (sammappadhāna)
9. base of power (iddhipāda)
10. enlightenment factor (bojjhanga)
11. path (magga)
12. absorption (jhāna)
13. immeasurables (appammaññā)
14. training rules (sikkhāpada)
15. analysis (paṭisambhidā)
16. knowledge (ñāṇa)
17. smaller subjects (khuddhaka vatthu)
18. heart of the Dhamma (dhammahadaya)

A typical chapter is divided into three parts:

- Sutta method: often consisting of quotations from the Sutta Pitaka
- Abhidhamma method: various lists of synonyms, numerical classifications
- Question method: applies the matika (matrix) of the Dhammasangani
