= Right Livelihood =

Right Livelihood may refer to:

- Right livelihood, a division of the Buddhisth Noble Eightfold Path
- Right Livelihood Award, an international award established in 1980 by German-Swedish philanthropist Jakob von Uexkull
