= Vīrya (Hinduism) =

Sanskrit term meaning virility

Vīrya (Sanskrit वीर्य) literally means "state of a strong man" or "manliness." In Hindu Vedic literature, the term is often associated with heroism and virility. In Brahmacharya in Hinduism, Virya also refers to semen in a male and it is considered to be the 'vital fluid'. Loss of Virya from the body is avoided in Brahmacharya.

== Vedic literature ==
Vīryà as "manly" and "hero" can be found, for instance, in the following excerpts from the Rig Veda (RV).

=== RV, Mandala 1, Hymn 32, v. 1 ===
1. I will declare the manly deeds of Indra, the first that he achieved, the Thunder-wielder. He slew the Dragon, then disclosed the waters, and cleft the channels of the mountain torrents.

=== RV, Mandala 1, Hymn 103, vv. 5-7 ===
5. See this abundant wealth that he possesses, and put your trust in Indra's hero vigour. He found the cattle, and he found the horses, he found the plants, the forests and the waters.

6. To him the truly strong, whose deeds are many, to him the strong Bull let us pour the Soma. The Hero, watching like a thief in ambush, goes parting the possessions of the godless.

7. Well didst thou do that hero deed, O Indra, in waking with thy bolt the slumbering Ahi. In thee, delighted, Dames divine rejoiced them, the flying Maruts and all Gods were joyful.

== See also ==
- Vīrya - for the Buddhist definition of this term

== Sources ==
- Griffith, Ralph T.H. (1896). Rig Veda. Available from "Wikisource" at http://en.wikisource.org/wiki/The_Rig_Veda .
- Monier-Williams, Monier (1899; rev. 2008). A Sanskrit-English Dictionary. Oxford: Clarendon Press. A general on-line search engine for this dictionary is available from "U. Cologne" at http://www.sanskrit-lexicon.uni-koeln.de/monier/index.html.
- Rhys Davids, T.W. & William Stede (eds.) (1921-5). The Pali Text Society's Pali–English Dictionary. Chipstead: Pali Text Society. A general on-line search engine for this dictionary is available at http://dsal.uchicago.edu/dictionaries/pali/.
