= Five Strengths =

Buddhist philosophical concept

Translations of pañcabalāni
- English: the five powers, the five strengths
- Sanskrit: पञ्चबलानि (pañcabalāni)
- Pali: pañcabalāni
- Chinese: 五力 (Pinyin: wǔ lì)
- Indonesian: lima kekuatan
- Japanese: 五力 (Rōmaji: goriki)
- Khmer: បញ្ចពល (banhja bula)
- Korean: 오력 (RR: olyeog)
- Tibetan: སྟོབས་ལྔའི་མིང་ལ་ (Wylie: stobs lnga'i ming la)
- Thai: เบญจพล (benjapol)
- Vietnamese: Ngũ lực

The Five Strengths (Sanskrit, Pali: pañcabalā) in Buddhism are faith, energy, mindfulness, concentration, and wisdom. They are one of the seven sets of Bodhipakkhiyadhamma ("qualities conducive to enlightenment"). They are paralleled in the five spiritual faculties, which are also part of the Bodhipakkhiyadhamma.

== Meaning ==
Pañca (Sanskrit, Pali) means "five." Bala (Sanskrit, Pali) means "power," "strength," "force."

The five strengths are:

1. Faith/Conviction (saddhā bala)
2. Energy/Effort/Persistence (viriya bala)
3. Mindfulness (sati bala)
4. Concentration (samādhi bala)
5. Wisdom/Discernment (paññā bala)

In the Abbidhamma-tradition, the five strengths are regarded as antidotes to ill will (vyapada), sloth and torpor (styana-middha), heedlessness (apramada) or sensual desire (kamacchanda), distraction or restlessness and worry (auddhatya-kaukrtya), and skeptical doubt (vicikitsa).

In SN 48.43, the Buddha declares that the five strengths are the five spiritual faculties and vice versa. He uses the metaphor of a stream passing by a mid-stream island; the island creates two streams, but the streams can also be seen as one and the same. The Pali commentaries remark that these five qualities are "faculties" when used to control their spheres of influence, and are "powers" when unshakeable by opposing forces.

== Interpretation ==
According to Le Sy Minh Tung, faith here does not mean blind trust, but using our intellect to carefully consider our actions. We should have faith in Enlightenment because when we reach Enlightenment, there are no more delusions or confusion. There should also be faith in striving to achieve the Right View (sammā-diṭṭhi) or the "right understanding", one of the factors Noble Eightfold Path. The right understanding includes knowing what is right or wrong and the nature of the self and the world. Lastly, we should also put faith in controlling and quieting down the six roots of sensation (the eyes, the ears, the nose, the tongue, the body, and the mind). According to Thich Nhat Hanh, faith can also be understood as confidence in ourselves. Faith can be applied to ideas but also practices.

According to Le Sy Minh Tung, energy is the drive to push forward on the journey of learning. When we have faith in the Buddhist teachings, we then commit to fulfilling what we believe in. There is no gain if there is only faith. Since the learning journey is full of obstacles, we need patience and strength to keep moving on our journey. The more we learn, the more interested we will be in the subjects. The more effort we put in, the less tired we will be. That is persistence. Thich Nhat Hanh claims that persistence is diligence in maintaining daily practices.

According to Le Sy Minh Tung, mindfulness is the accumulation and preservation within us. We need to be mindful in committing good deeds like helping and donating what we can to others. We could donate money and properties to the poor or deliver teachings to bring people out of misery and reach Enlightenment. We also need to enforce mindfulness in preserving what we have learned, keeping a clear mind, and not losing sight of the right path. In practice, Thich Nhat Hanh believes that mindfulness involves avoiding the events that invoke negative seeds/feelings within us. We should consume information mindfully and not let negative thoughts contaminate our minds.

According to Le Sy Minh Tung, concentration is quietness of the mind. The goal is to keep the focus on the dharma and use the mind to practice. There are three types of samadhi:

1. elimination of all mental obstacles;
2. elimination of mental obstacles gives great merit;
3. this merit should benefit all sentient beings, helping them to attain liberation.

According to Le Sy Minh Tung, wisdom refers to having a clear mind. There is no more discrimination, differentiation, or distinguishment. Discrimination or differentiation comes from deluded consciousness. It then causes people to chase after the Three Poisons. For example, we denote an object as good or bad, beautiful or ugly, etc. However, these connotations are delusions. When we learn to stop differentiating objects, people, and other aspects of the world, we have gained wisdom. Wisdom can be achieved with many methods including meditation which helps to clear our minds and get rid of delusions.

== See also ==
- Bodhipakkhiyadhamma - lists the 37 qualities conducive to Enlightenment, which includes the Five Powers.
- Five Wisdoms
- Index of Buddhism-related articles
- Indriya - "faculty," includes extended discussion of the Five Spiritual Faculties.
- Secular Buddhism
