= Vīrya =

Buddhist term

Translations of vīrya
- English: diligence, energy, perseverance, enthusiasm, sustained effort, help
- Sanskrit: वीर्य (IAST: vīrya)
- Pali: विरिय (viriya)
- Burmese: ဝီရိယ (MLCTS: wə rḭ ja̰)
- Chinese: 勤(T) / 勤(S), 精進(T) / 精进(S)
- Japanese: 精進 (Rōmaji: shōjin)
- Khmer: ថាមពល (UNGEGN: thamôpôl)
- Korean: 근, 정진 (RR: geun, jeongjin)
- Sinhala: වීර්යය
- Tagalog: birisa
- Tibetan: བརྩོན་འགྲུས། (Wylie: brtson 'grus; THL: tsöndrü)
- Vietnamese: Tinh Tấn

Vīrya (Sanskrit; Pali: viriya) is a Buddhist term commonly translated as "energy", "diligence", "enthusiasm", "effort", "heroism", or "help". It can be defined as an attitude of gladly engaging in wholesome activities, and it functions to cause one to accomplish wholesome or virtuous actions.

== Etymology ==
Vīrya literally means "state of a strong human" or "manliness." In Vedic literature, the term is associated with heroism and virility.

In Buddhism, virya refers to a practitioner's "energy", "persistence", "persevering," "vigour", "effort", "diligence", or "exertion", and is repeatedly identified as a necessary prerequisite for achieving liberation.

== Mental factor ==
Within the Buddhist Abhidharma teachings, virya is identified as:

- One of the six occasional mental factors within the Theravada Abhidharma
- One of the eleven virtuous mental factors within the Mahayana Abhidharma

In this context, virya is defined as the attitude of gladly engaging in what is wholesome; its function is to cause one to accomplish wholesome actions.

The Abhidharma-samuccaya states:

What is virya? It is the mind intent on being ever active, devoted, unshaken, not turning back and being indefatigable. It perfects and realizes what is conducive to the positive.

In the context of the Mahayana Abhidharma, virya is commonly translated as diligence.

== Pali literature ==
In Buddhism's Pali literature, viriya is identified as critical component in each of the following sets of qualities conducive to Enlightenment (bodhi-pakkhiyā-dhammā):

- the five spiritual faculties (indriya)
- the five powers (bala)
- the ten or six "perfections" (pāramitās)
- the seven factors of enlightenment (bojjhaṅga).

It is also associated with "Right Effort" (sammā-vāyāma) of the Noble Eightfold Path (Pāli: aṭṭhaṅgiko maggo; Skt.: aṣṭāṅga mārga) and with the "Four Right Exertions" (samma-ppadhāna).

In the Kīṭāgiri Sutta (MN 70), the Buddha instructs his followers:

... For a faithful disciple who is intent on fathoming the Teacher's Dispensation, it is natural that he conduct himself thus: 'Willingly, let only my skin, sinews, and bones remain, and let the flesh and blood dry up on my body, but my energy [Pali: viriya] shall not be relaxed so long as I have not attained what can be attained by manly strength [purisa-tthāmena], manly energy [purisa-viriyena], and manly persistence [purisa-parakkamena]...."

== Other characterizations ==
Viriya stands for strenuous and sustained effort to overcome unskillful ways (akusala dhamma), such as indulging in sensuality, ill will and harmfulness (see, e.g., ahiṃsā and nekkhamma).

Viriya can also be aroused by strong feelings of saṃvega and the practice of the charnel ground meditations as outlined in the Satipatthana sutta.

It stands for the right endeavour to attain dhyāna.

Vīrya can also signify courage and physical strength and was cultivated by Buddhist guardians including the Shaolin monks. It signifies strength of character and persistent effort for the well-being of others as well as the ability to defend the Triratna from attacks.

In the absence of sustained effort in practicing meditation, craving creeps in and the meditator comes under its influence. Right effort (vīryabala) is thus required to overcome unskillful mental factors and deviation from dhyāna.

== See also ==
- Adhiṭṭhāna (resolute determination)
- Bodhipakkhiya dhamma (Qualities conducive to Enlightenment)
- Dāna (generosity)
- Five Faculties
- Five Powers
- Four Right Exertions
- Khanti (patience)
- Metta (loving-kindness)
- Nekkhamma (renunciation)
- Noble Eightfold Path
- Pañña (wisdom)
- Passaddhi (tranquillity)
- Sacca (truth)
- Sisu (A similar concept in Finnish culture)
- Upekkhā (equanimity)
- Vīrya (Hinduism)

== Sources ==
- Bullitt, John T. (2005). A Glossary of Pali and Buddhist Terms. Available from "Access to Insight" (ATI).
- Griffith, Ralph T.H. (1896). Rig Veda.
- Guenther, Herbert V. & Leslie S. Kawamura (1975), Mind in Buddhist Psychology: A Translation of Ye-shes rgyal-mtshan's "The Necklace of Clear Understanding". Dharma Publishing. Kindle Edition.
- Ireland, John D. (trans.) (1998). "Meghiya Sutta: Meghiya" (Ud. 4.1). Retrieved 7 February 2011 from "Access to Insight".
- Kunsang, Erik Pema (translator) (2004). Gateway to Knowledge, Vol. 1. North Atlantic Books.
- Monier-Williams, Monier (1899; rev. 2008). A Sanskrit-English Dictionary. Oxford: Clarendon Press. A general on-line search engine for this dictionary is available from "U. Cologne".
- Ñāṇamoli, Bhikkhu (trans.) & Bodhi, Bhikkhu (ed.) (2001). The Middle-Length Discourses of the Buddha: A Translation of the Majjhima Nikāya. Boston: Wisdom Publications. ISBN 0-86171-072-X.
- Piyadassi, Thera (1999). "Gilana Sutta: Ill (Factors of Enlightenment)" (SN 46.14). Retrieved 7 February 2011 from "Access to Insight".
- Rhys Davids, T.W. & William Stede (eds.) (1921-5). The Pali Text Society's Pali–English Dictionary. Chipstead: Pali Text Society.
- Thanissaro, Bhikkhu (trans.) (2005). "Kitagiri Sutta: At Kitagiri" (MN 70). Retrieved 6 February 2011 from "Access to Insight".
- Walshe, Maurice O'Connell (trans.) (2009). "Pade Sutta: In the Foot" (SN 48.54). Retrieved 7 February 2011 from "Access to Insight".
