= Four Right Exertions =

Buddhist philosophical concept

The Four Right Exertions
	unarisen	arisen
unwholesome states of mind	prevent	abandon
wholesome states of mind	arouse	maintain

The Four Right Exertions (also known as, Four Proper Exertions, Four Right Efforts, Four Great Efforts, Four Right Endeavors or Four Right Strivings) (Pali: sammappadhāna; Skt.: samyak-pradhāna or samyakprahāṇa) are an integral part of the Buddhist path to Enlightenment (understanding). Built on the insightful recognition of the arising and non-arising of various mental qualities over time and of our ability to mindfully intervene in these ephemeral qualities, the Four Right Exertions encourage the relinquishment of harmful mental qualities and the nurturing of beneficial mental qualities.

The Four Right Exertions are associated with the Noble Eightfold Path's factor of "right effort" (sammā-vāyāma) and the Five Spiritual Faculties' faculty of "energy" (viriya); and, are one of the seven sets of Bodhipakkhiyadhamma, factors related to bodhi.

== In the Pali literature ==
The Four Right Exertions are found in the Vinaya Pitaka, Sutta Pitaka, Abhidhamma Pitaka and Pali commentaries. Additionally, a similar-sounding but different concept, the "four exertions," is referenced in the literature as well. These two concepts are presented below.

=== Four Right Exertions ===
The Four Right Exertions (cattārimāni sammappadhānāni) are defined with the following traditional phrase:

"There is the case where a monk generates desire, endeavors, activates persistence, upholds & exerts his intent for:
"[i] the sake of the non-arising [anuppādāya] of evil, unskillful qualities that have not yet arisen.
"[ii] ... the sake of the abandonment [pahānāya] of evil, unskillful qualities that have arisen.
"[iii] ... the sake of the arising [uppādāya] of skillful qualities that have not yet arisen.
"[iv] ... the maintenance [ṭhitiyā], non-confusion, increase, plenitude, development, & culmination of skillful qualities that have arisen."

This elaboration is attributed to the Buddha in response to the following questions:

- "What is right effort?" (SN 45.8, in the context of the Noble Eightfold Path)
- "What is the faculty of energy?" (SN 48.10, in the context of the Five Spiritual Faculties)
- "What are the four right strivings?" (SN 49.1ff.)

This formulation is also part of an extensive exposition by Ven. Sariputta when addressing the question of "What is this Dhamma that has been well-proclaimed by the Lord [Buddha]?" (DN 33). In addition, in a section of the Anguttara Nikaya known as the "Snap of the Fingers Section" (AN 1.16.6, Accharāsaṇghātavaggo), the Buddha is recorded as stating that, if a monk were to enact one of the four right exertions for the snap of the fingers (or, "only for one moment") then "he abides in jhana, has done his duties by the Teacher, and eats the country's alms food without a debt."

A similar two-part elaboration is provided by the Buddha in SN 48.9, again in the context of the Five Spiritual Faculties, when he states:

"And what, bhikkhus, is the faculty of energy? Here, bhikkhus, the noble disciple dwells with energy aroused for the abandoning of unwholesome states and the acquisition of wholesome states; he is strong, firm in exertion, not shirking the responsibility of cultivating wholesome states. This is the faculty of energy."

What constitutes "unskillful" or "unwholesome" (akusala) and "skillful" or "wholesome" (kusala) qualities is taken up in the Abhidhamma Pitaka and the post-canonical Pali commentaries. In general, the unskillful states are the three defilements (kilesa): greed (lobha), hatred (dosa) and delusion (moha). Skillful states are the defilements' opposites: non-greed (alobha), non-hatred (adosa) and non-delusion (amoha).

=== Four Exertions ===
Throughout the Pali Canon, a distinction is made between the fourfold "exertions" (padhāna) and the four "Right Exertions" (sammappadhāna). While similarly named, canonical discourses consistently define these different terms differently, even in the same or adjacent discourses.

The four exertions (cattārimāni padhānāni) are summarized as:

1. Restraint (saṃvara padhāna) of the senses.
2. Abandonment (pahāna padhāna) of defilements.
3. Cultivation (bhāvanā padhāna) of Enlightenment Factors.
4. Preservation (anurakkhaṇā padhāna) of concentration, for instance, using charnel-ground contemplations.

== See also ==
- Ayatana (Sense Bases)
- Bodhi (Enlightenment)
- Bodhipakkhiyadhamma (Enlightenment Qualities)
- Bojjhanga (Enlightenment Factors)
- Buddhist meditation
- Iddhipada (Bases of Spiritual Power)
- Indriya (Spiritual Faculty)
- Kilesa (Defilement)
- Noble Eightfold Path
- Samadhi (Concentration)
- Viriya (Effort)

== Sources ==
- Bodhi, Bhikkhu (trans.) (2000). The Connected Discourses of the Buddha: A Translation of the Samyutta Nikaya. Boston: Wisdom Publications. ISBN 0-86171-331-1.
- Buddhaghosa, Bhadantacariya & Bhikkhu Ñāṇamoli (trans.) (1999). The Path of Purification: Visuddhimagga. Seattle, WA: BPS Pariyatti Editions. ISBN 1-928706-00-2.
- Jayasundere, A.D. (trans.) (n.d.). "Caravaggo" (AN 4, ch. 2). Retrieved on 2007-05-30 from "METTANET - LANKA" at: https://web.archive.org/web/20130705174936/http://www.metta.lk/tipitaka/2Sutta-Pitaka/4Anguttara-Nikaya/Anguttara2/4-catukkanipata/002-caravaggo-e2.html.
- Ñanamoli Thera (trans.) & Bhikkhu Bodhi (ed.) (1991). The Discourse on Right View: The Sammaditthi Sutta and its Commentary (The Wheel Publication No. 377/379). Kandy: Buddhist Publication Society. Retrieved on 2007-08-25 from "Access to Insight" (1994) at: http://www.accesstoinsight.org/lib/authors/nanamoli/wheel377.html.
- Rhys Davids, T.W. & William Stede (eds.) (1921-5). The Pali Text Society's Pali–English Dictionary. Chipstead: Pali Text Society. A general on-line search engine for the PED is available at http://dsal.uchicago.edu/dictionaries/pali/.
- Thanissaro Bhikkhu (trans.) (1987, 1996). Magga-vibhanga Sutta: An Analysis of the Path (SN 45.8). Retrieved on 2007-05-28 from "Access to Insight" at: http://www.accesstoinsight.org/tipitaka/sn/sn45/sn45.008.than.html.
- Upalavanna, Sister. (trans.) (n.d.). "Ekadhammapali: One thing" (AN 1, ch. 16). Retrieved on 2007-08-25 from "METTANET - LANKA" at: https://web.archive.org/web/20110116045748/http://www.metta.lk/tipitaka/2Sutta-Pitaka/4Anguttara-Nikaya/Anguttara1/1-ekanipata/016-Ekadhammapali-e.html.
- Walshe, Maurice O'C. (1995). The Long Discourses of the Buddha: A Translation of the Digha Nikaya. Somerville, MA: Wisdom Publications. ISBN 0-86171-103-3.
