= Noble Eightfold Path =

Buddhist practices leading to liberation from saṃsāra

Translations of The Noble Eightfold Path
- Sanskrit: आर्याष्टाङ्गमार्ग (IAST: āryāṣṭāṅgamārga)
- Pali: අරිය අට්ඨංගික මග්ග (ariya aṭṭhaṅgika magga)
- Bengali: অষ্টাঙ্গিক আর্য মার্গ (Astangik ārya mārga Oșŧangik Azzo Maggo; Oșŧangik Arzo Margo)
- Burmese: မဂ္ဂင်ရှစ်ပါး (MLCTS: mɛʔɡɪ̀ɰ̃ ʃɪʔ pá)
- Chinese: 八正道 (Pinyin: bā zhèngdào)
- Japanese: 八正道 (Rōmaji: Hasshōdō)
- Khmer: អរិយដ្ឋង្គិកមគ្គ (UNGEGN: areyadthangkikameak)
- Korean: 팔정도 八正道 (RR: Paljeongdo)
- Mongolian: ᠣᠦᠲᠦᠶᠲᠠᠨᠦ ᠨᠠᠢᠮᠠᠨ ᠭᠡᠰᠢᠭᠦᠨᠦ ᠮᠥᠷ; Найман гишүүт хутагт мөр (qutuγtan-u naiman gesigün-ü mör)
- Sinhala: ආර්ය අෂ්ඨාංගික මාර්ගය (ārya ashṯāṅgika mārgaya)
- Tagalog: Waluhang Mahal na Landas ᜏᜎᜓᜑᜅ᜔ᜋᜑᜎ᜔ᜈᜎᜈ᜔ᜇᜐ᜔
- Tamil: உன்னத எட்டு மடங்கு பாதை (unnata ettu matanku paatai)
- Tibetan: འཕགས་པའི་ལམ་ཡན་ལག་བརྒྱད་པ (Wylie: 'phags pa'i lam yan lag brgyad pa THL: pakpé lam yenlak gyépa)
- Thai: อริยมรรคมีองค์แปด (RTGS: Ariya Mak Mi Ong Paet)
- Vietnamese: Bát chính đạo 八正道

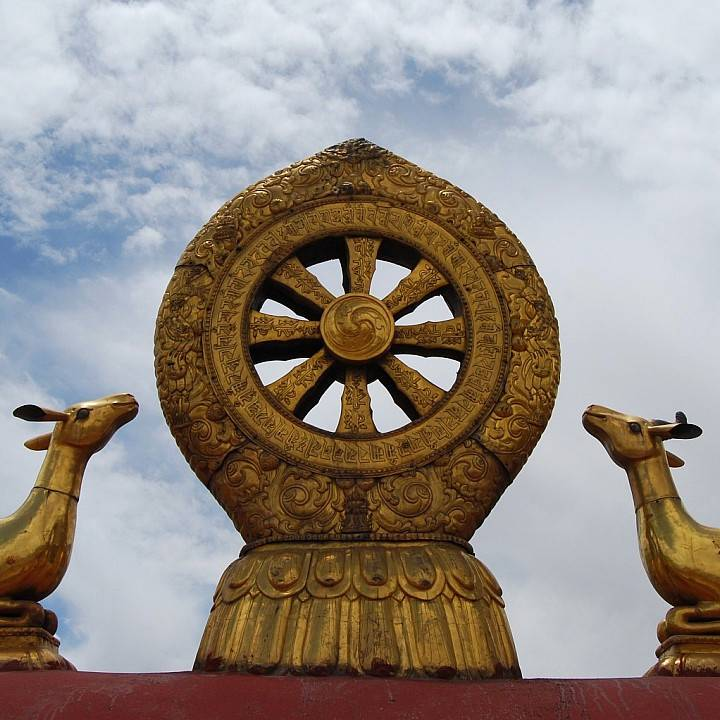
The eight-spoked Dharma wheel symbolizes the Noble Eightfold Path.

The Noble Eightfold Path (Pali: අරිය අට්ඨංගික මග්ග, romanized: ariya aṭṭhaṅgika magga Sanskrit: आर्याष्टाङ्गमार्ग, romanized: āryāṣṭāṅgamārga Sinhala: ආර්‍ය අෂ්ඨාංගික මාර්ගය, romanized: Arya Ashṭhaṅgika Margaya) or Eight Right Paths (Sanskrit: अष्टसम्यङ्मार्ग, romanized: aṣṭasamyaṅmārga) is an early summary of the path of Buddhist practices leading to liberation from samsara, the painful cycle of rebirth, in the form of nirvana.

The Eightfold Path consists of eight practices: right view, right resolve, right speech, right conduct, right livelihood, right effort, right mindfulness, and right samadhi ('meditative absorption or union'; alternatively, equanimous meditative awareness).

In early Buddhism, these practices started with understanding that the body-mind works in a corrupted way (right view), followed by entering the Buddhist path of self-observance, self-restraint, and cultivating kindness and compassion; and culminating in dhyana or samadhi, which reinforces these practices for the development of the body-mind. In later Buddhism, insight (prajñā) became the central soteriological instrument, leading to a different concept and structure of the path, in which the "goal" of the Buddhist path came to be specified as ending ignorance and rebirth.

The Noble Eightfold Path is one of the principal summaries of the Buddhist teachings, taught to lead to Arhatship. In the Theravada tradition, this path is also summarized as sila (morality), samadhi (meditation) and prajna (insight). In Mahayana Buddhism, this path is contrasted with the Bodhisattva path, which is believed to go beyond Arhatship to full Buddhahood.

In Buddhist symbolism, the Noble Eightfold Path is often represented by means of the dharma wheel (dharmachakra), in which its eight spokes represent the eight elements of the path.

== Etymology and nomenclature ==
The Pali term ariya aṭṭhaṅgika magga (Sanskrit: āryāṣṭāṅgamārga) is typically translated in English as 'Noble Eightfold Path'. This translation is a convention started by the early translators of Buddhist texts into English, just like ariya sacca is translated as 'Four Noble Truths'. However, the phrase does not mean the path is noble, rather that the path is of the noble people (Pali: ariya, meaning 'enlightened, noble, precious people'). The term magga (Sanskrit: mārga) means 'path', while aṭṭhaṅgika (Sanskrit: aṣṭāṅga) means 'eightfold'. Thus, an alternate rendering of ariya aṭṭhaṅgika magga is 'eightfold path of the noble ones', or 'Eightfold Ariya Path'.

All eight elements of the Path begin with the word samyañc (in Sanskrit) or sammā (in Pāli) which means 'right, proper, as it ought to be, best'. The Buddhist texts contrast samma with its opposite, miccha.

The Noble Eightfold Path, in the Buddhist traditions, is the direct means to nirvana and brings a release from the cycle of life and death in the realms of samsara.

== The eight divisions ==
=== Origins: the Middle Way ===
According to Indologist Tilmann Vetter, the description of the Buddhist path may initially have been as simple as the term the Middle Way. In time, this short description was elaborated, resulting in the description of the Eightfold Path. Tilmann Vetter and historian Rod Bucknell both note that longer descriptions of "the path" can be found in the early texts, which can be condensed into the Eightfold Path. (Note: One of those longer sequences, from the CulaHatthipadopama-sutta, the "Lesser Discourse on the Simile of the Elephant's Footprints", is as follows: 1. Dhammalsaddhalpabbajja: A layman hears a Buddha teach the Dhamma, comes to have faith in him, and decides to take ordination as a monk; 2. sila: He adopts the moral precepts; 3. indriyasamvara: He practises "guarding the six sense-doors"; 4. sati-sampajanna: He practises mindfulness and self-possession (actually described as mindfulness of the body, kāyānussatti); 5. jhana 1: He finds an isolated spot in which to meditate, purifies his mind of the hindrances (nwarana), and attains the first rupa-jhana; 6. jhana 2: He attains the second jhana; 7. jhana 3: He attains the third jhana; 8. jhana 4: He attains the fourth jhana; 9. pubbenivasanussati-nana: he recollects his many former existences in samsara; 10. sattanam cutupapata-nana: he observes the death and rebirth of beings according to their karmas; 11. dsavakkhaya-nana: He brings about the destruction of the dsavas (cankers), and attains a profound realization of (as opposed to mere knowledge about) the four noble truths; 12. vimutti: He perceives that he is now liberated, that he has done what was to be done.; A similar sequence can be found in the Samaññaphala Sutta.)

=== Tenfold path ===
In the Mahācattārīsaka Sutta, which appears in the Chinese and Pali canons, the Buddha explains that cultivation of the noble eightfold path of a learner leads to the development of two further paths of the Arahants, which are right knowledge, or insight (sammā-ñāṇa), and right liberation, or release (sammā-vimutti). These two factors fall under the category of wisdom (paññā).

=== Short description of the eight divisions ===
The eight Buddhist practices in the Noble Eightfold Path are:

1. Right View: various summaries of "right view" can be found in the sutras. A stock phrase is the opening of the dharma-eye, in which knowledge arises: "all that has the nature of arising has the nature of ending"; (Note: In effect to the exposition of the four truths, as presented in the Dhammacakkappavattana Sutta, the "dustless, stainless Dhamma eye" arose to Kondañña, stating: "Whatever is subject to origination is all subject to cessation," though originally the opening may not have been associated with the opening of the dhamma-eye, but with the subsequent destruction of the asavas.) showing the futility of striving after worldly fullfilment. More extensive treatments state that our actions have consequences, death is not the end, and our actions and beliefs have consequences after death. The Buddha followed and taught a successful path out of this world and the other world (heaven and underworld/hell), (Note: Victor Gunasekara, The Pāyāsi Sutta: A Commentary and Analysis) and his example is to be followed. Later on, right view came to explicitly include karma and rebirth, and the importance of the Four Noble Truths, when "insight" became central to Buddhist soteriology, especially in Theravada Buddhism.
2. Right Resolve (samyaka-saṃkalpa/sammā-saṅkappa) can also be known as "right thought", "right aspiration", or "right motivation". In this factor, one resolves to leave home, renounce the worldly life and follow the Buddhist path. The practitioner resolves to strive toward non-violence (ahimsa) and avoid violent and hateful conduct.
3. Right Speech: no lying, no abusive speech, no divisive speech, no idle chatter.
4. Right Conduct or Action: no killing or injuring, no taking what is not given, no sexual misconduct, no material desires.
5. Right Livelihood: no trading in weapons, living beings, meat, liquor, or poisons.
6. Right Effort: preventing the arising of unwholesome states, and generating wholesome states, the bojjhaṅgā (Seven Factors of Awakening). This includes indriya-samvara, "guarding the sense-doors", restraint of the sense faculties, akin to pratyahara.
7. Right Mindfulness (sati; Satipatthana; Sampajañña): a quality that guards or watches over the mind; the stronger it becomes, the weaker unwholesome states of mind become, weakening their power "to take over and dominate thought, word and deed." (Note: According to Frauwallner, mindfulness was a means to prevent the arising of craving, which resulted simply from contact between the senses and their objects; this may have been the Buddha's original idea; compare Buddhadasa, Heartwood of the Bodhi-tree, on Pratītyasamutpāda; and Grzegorz Polak (2011), Reexamining Jhana: Towards a Critical Reconstruction of Early Buddhist Soteriology, p.153-156, 196–197.) In the vipassana movement, sati is interpreted as "bare attention": never be absent minded, being conscious of what one is doing; this encourages the awareness of the impermanence of body, feeling and mind, as well as to experience the five aggregates (skandhas), the five hindrances, the four True Realities and seven factors of awakening.
8. Right samadhi (passaddhi; ekaggata; sampasadana): practicing four stages of dhyāna ("meditation"), which includes samadhi proper in the second stage, and reinforces the development of the bojjhaṅgā, culminating into upekkhā (equanimity) and mindfulness. In the Theravada tradition and the vipassana movement, this is interpreted as ekaggata, concentration or one-pointedness of the mind, and supplemented with vipassana meditation, which aims at insight.

=== Right view ===
The purpose of "right view" (samyak-dṛṣṭi / sammā-diṭṭhi) or "right understanding" is to clear one's path from confusion, misunderstanding, and deluded thinking. It is a means to gain right understanding of reality.

==== Sequences in the suttas ====
The Pali canon and the Agamas contain various "definitions" or descriptions of "right view." The Mahasatipatthana Sutta (Digha Nikaya 22), compiled from elements from other suttas possibly as late as 20 BCE, defines right view summarily as the Four Noble Truths:

And what is right view? Knowing about suffering, the origin of suffering, the cessation of suffering, and the practice that leads to the cessation of suffering. This is called right view.

In this, right view explicitly includes karma and rebirth, and the importance of the Four Noble Truths. This view of "right view" gained importance when "insight" became central to Buddhist soteriology, and still plays an essential role in Theravada Buddhism.

Mahācattārīsaka Sutta
And what is right view? Right view is twofold, I say. There is right view that is accompanied by defilements, has the attributes of good deeds, and ripens in attachment. And there is right view that is noble, undefiled, transcendent, a factor of the path.

And what is right view that is accompanied by defilements, has the attributes of good deeds, and ripens in attachment? 'There is meaning in giving, sacrifice, (Note: Vetter translates it as "offering into the fire".) and offerings. There are fruits and results of good and bad deeds. There is an afterlife. There are such things as [serving] mother and father, and beings [devas] that are reborn spontaneously. And there are ascetics and Brahmins who are well attained and practiced, and who describe the afterlife after realizing it with their own insight.' This is right view that is accompanied by defilements, has the attributes of good deeds, and ripens in attachment.

And what is right view that is noble, undefiled, transcendent, a factor of the path? It's the wisdom—the faculty of wisdom, the power of wisdom, the awakening factor of investigation of principles [dhamma vicaya], and right view as a factor of the path—in one of noble mind and undefiled mind, who possesses the noble path and develops the noble path. This is called right view that is noble, undefiled, transcendent, a factor of the path.

They make an effort to give up wrong view and embrace right view: that's their right effort. Mindfully they give up wrong view and take up right view: that's their right mindfulness. So these three things keep running and circling around right view, namely: right view, right effort, and right mindfulness. (Note: Compare the stock sequence of a "graduated talk" and "the distinctive teaching of the Awakened Ones": "Then the Blessed One gave a graduated talk to Upāli the householder, i.e., a talk on giving, a talk on virtue, a talk on heaven; he proclaimed the drawbacks of, degradation in, & defilement in sensuality, and the rewards of renunciation. Then—when he knew that Upāli the householder was of ready mind, malleable mind, unhindered mind, exultant mind, confident mind—he proclaimed to him the distinctive teaching of the Awakened Ones: stress, origination, cessation, path. Just as a white cloth with stains removed would rightly take dye, in the same way there arose to Upāli the householder, in that very seat, the dustless, stainless Dhamma eye: Whatever is subject to origination is all subject to cessation. Then—having seen the Dhamma, having reached the Dhamma, known the Dhamma, gained a footing in the Dhamma, having crossed over & beyond doubt, having had no more questioning—Upāli the householder gained fearlessness and was independent of others with regard to the Teacher's message.")

Other suttas give a more extensive overview, stating that our actions have consequences, that death is not the end, that our actions and beliefs also have consequences after death, and that the Buddha followed and taught a successful path out of this world and the other world (heaven and underworld or hell). The Mahācattārīsaka Sutta ("The Great Forty," Majjhima Nikaya 117) gives an extensive overview, describing the first seven practices as requisites of right samadhi c.q. dhyana. It makes a distinction between mundane right view (karma, rebirth) and noble right view as a path-factor, relating noble right view to dhamma vicaya ("investigation of principles), one of the bojjhanga, the "seven factors of awakening" which give an alternate account of right effort and dhyana.

Alternatively, right view (together with right resolve) is expressed in the stock phrase of dhammalsaddhalpabbajja: "A layman hears a Buddha teach the Dhamma, comes to have faith in him, and decides to take ordination as a monk." (Note: See the CulaHatthipadopama-sutta (the "Lesser Discourse on the Simile of the Elephant's Footprints") and the Samaññaphala Sutta)

Sammādiṭṭhi Sutta
The venerable Sāriputta said to the venerable Mahākotthita: "Just ask, friend, knowing I shall answer." The venerable Mahākotthita said to the venerable Sāriputta: "Having accomplished what factors is a learned noble disciple in this teaching and discipline reckoned to be endowed with [right] view, to have accomplished straight view, to have accomplished unshakeable confidence in the Buddha, to have come to and arrived at the right teaching, to have attained this right Dharma and awoken to this right Dharma?"

The venerable Sāriputta said: "Venerable Mahākotthita, [this takes place if] a learned noble disciple understands unwholesome states as they really are, understands the roots of unwholesomeness as they really are, understands wholesome states as they really are and understands the roots of wholesomeness as they really are.

"How does [a learned noble disciple] understand unwholesome states as they really are? Unwholesome bodily actions, verbal actions and mental actions − these are reckoned unwholesome states. In this way unwholesome states are understood as they really are.

"How does [a learned noble disciple] understand the roots of unwholesomeness as they really are? There are three roots of unwholesomeness: greed is a root of unwholesomeness, hatred is a root of unwholesomeness, and delusion is a root of unwholesomeness − these are reckoned the roots of unwholesomeness. In this way the roots of unwholesomeness are understood as they really are.

"How does [a learned noble disciple] understand wholesome states as they really are? Wholesome bodily actions, verbal actions and mental actions − these are reckoned wholesome states. In this way wholesome states are understood as they really are.

"How does [a learned noble disciple] understand the roots of wholesomeness as they really are? That is, there are three roots of wholesomeness: non-greed, non-hatred and non-delusion − these are reckoned the roots of wholesomeness. In this way the roots of wholesomeness are understood as they really are.

"Venerable Mahākotthita, [if] in this way a learned noble disciple understands unwholesome states as they really are, understands the roots of unwholesomeness as they really are, understands wholesome states as they really are and understands the roots of wholesomeness as they really are; then, for this reason, [a learned noble disciple] in this teaching and discipline is endowed with right view, has accomplished straight view, has accomplished unshakeable confidence in the Buddha, has come to and arrived at the right teaching, has attained this right Dharma and awoken to this right Dharma."

Likewise, the Sammādiṭṭhi Sutta (Majjhima Nikaya 9), and its parallel in the Samyukta-āgama, refer to faith in the Buddha and understanding (dhamma vicaya) the path-factors of wholesome bodily actions, verbal actions and mental actions.

==== Theravada ====
Right View can be further subdivided, states translator Bhikkhu Bodhi, into mundane right view and superior or supramundane right view:

1. Mundane right view, knowledge of the fruits of good behavior (karma). Having this type of view will bring merit and will support the favourable rebirth of the sentient being in the realm of samsara.
2. Supramundane (world-transcending) right view, the understanding of the Four Noble Truths, leading to awakening and liberation from rebirths and associated dukkha in the realms of samsara. According to Bhikkhu Bodhi, this kind of right view comes at the end of the path, not at the beginning.

Mundane and supramundane right view involve accepting the following doctrines of Buddhism:

1. Karma: Every action of body, speech, and mind has karmic results, and influences the kind of future rebirths and realms a being enters into.
2. Three marks of existence: everything, whether physical or mental, is impermanent (anicca), a source of suffering (dukkha), and lacks a self (anatta).
3. The Four Noble Truths are a means to gaining insights and ending dukkha.

==== A-ditthi ====
Gombrich notes that there is a tension in the suttas between "right view" and 'no view', release by not clinging to any view at all. According to Chryssides and Wilkins, "right view is ultimately non-view: though the Enlightened One sees things as they really are, 'he has a "critical awareness" of the impossibility of giving full and final expression to his conviction in fixed conceptual terms'. One therefore cannot cling to any particular formulation in a rigid and dogmatic manner."

=== Right resolve ===
Right Resolve (samyak-saṃkalpa / sammā-saṅkappa) can also be known as "right thought", "right aspiration", or "right motivation". In section III.248, the Majjhima Nikaya states,

And what is right resolve? Being resolved on renunciation, on freedom from ill will, on harmlessness: This is called right resolve.

Like right view, this factor has two levels. At the mundane level, the resolve includes being harmless (ahimsa) and refraining from ill will (avyapadha) to any being, as this accrues karma and leads to rebirth. At the supramundane level, the factor includes a resolve to consider everything and everyone as impermanent, a source of suffering and without a Self.

=== Right speech ===
Right speech (samyag-vāc / sammā-vācā) in most Buddhist texts is presented as four abstentions, such as in the Pali Canon thus:

And what is right speech? Abstaining from lying, from divisive speech, from abusive speech, and from idle chatter: This is called right speech.

Instead of the usual "abstention and refraining from wrong." terminology, a few texts such as the Samaññaphala Sutta and Kevata Sutta in Digha Nikaya explain this virtue in an active sense, after stating it in the form of an abstention. For example, Samaññaphala Sutta states that a part of a monk's virtue is that "he abstains from false speech. He speaks the truth, holds to the truth, is firm, reliable, no deceiver of the world." Similarly, the virtue of abstaining from divisive speech is explained as delighting in creating concord. The virtue of abstaining from abusive speech is explained in this Sutta to include affectionate and polite speech that is pleasing to people. The virtue of abstaining from idle chatter is explained as speaking what is connected with the Dhamma goal of his liberation.

In the Abhaya-raja-kumara Sutta, the Buddha explains the virtue of right speech in different scenarios, based on its truth value, utility value and emotive content. The Tathagata, states Abhaya Sutta, never speaks anything that is unfactual or factual, untrue or true, disagreeable or agreeable, if that is unbeneficial and unconnected to his goals. Further, adds Abhaya Sutta, the Tathagata speaks the factual, the true, if in case it is disagreeable and unendearing, only if it is beneficial to his goals, but with a sense of proper time. Additionally, adds Abhaya Sutta, the Tathagata, only speaks with a sense of proper time even when what he speaks is the factual, the true, the agreeable, the endearing and what is beneficial to his goals.

The Buddha thus explains right speech in the Pali Canon, according to Ganeri, as never speaking something that is not beneficial; and, only speaking what is true and beneficial, "when the circumstances are right, whether they are welcome or not".

=== Right action ===
Right action (samyak-karmānta / sammā-kammanta) is like right speech, expressed as abstentions but in terms of bodily action. In the Pali Canon, this path factor is stated as:

And what is right action? Abstaining from killing, abstaining from stealing, abstaining from sexual misconduct. This is called right action.

The prohibition on killing precept in Buddhist scriptures applies to all living beings, states Christopher Gowans, not just human beings. Bhikkhu Bodhi agrees, clarifying that the more accurate rendering of the Pali canon is a prohibition on "taking life of any sentient being", which includes human beings, animals, birds, insects but excludes plants because they are not considered sentient beings. Further, adds Bodhi, this precept refers to intentional killing, as well as any form of intentional harming or torturing any sentient being. This moral virtue in early Buddhist texts, both in context of harm or killing of animals and human beings, is similar to ahimsa precepts found in the texts particularly of Jainism as well as of Hinduism, and has been a subject of significant debate in various Buddhist traditions.

The prohibition on stealing in the Pali Canon is an abstention from intentionally taking what is not voluntarily offered by the person to whom that property belongs. This includes taking by stealth, by force, by fraud or by deceit. Both the intention and the act matters, as this precept is grounded on the impact on one's karma.

The prohibition on sexual misconduct in the Noble Eightfold Path refers to "not performing sexual acts". This virtue is more generically explained in the Cunda Kammaraputta Sutta, which teaches that one must abstain from all sensual misconduct, including getting sexually involved with someone unmarried (anyone protected by parents or by guardians or by siblings), and someone married (protected by husband), and someone betrothed to another person, and female convicts or by dhamma.

For monastics, the abstention from sensual misconduct means strict celibacy while for lay Buddhists this prohibits adultery as well as other forms of sensual misconduct. Later Buddhist texts state that the prohibition on sexual conduct for lay Buddhists includes any sexual involvement with someone married, a girl or woman protected by her parents or relatives, and someone prohibited by dhamma conventions (such as relatives, nuns and others).

=== Right livelihood ===
Right livelihood (samyag-ājīva / sammā-ājīva) precept is mentioned in many early Buddhist texts, such as the Mahācattārīsaka Sutta in Majjhima Nikaya as follows:

And what is right livelihood? Right livelihood, I tell you, is of two sorts: There is right livelihood with effluents, siding with merit, resulting in acquisitions; there is right livelihood that is noble, without effluents, transcendent, a factor of the path.

And what is the right livelihood with effluents, siding with merit, resulting in acquisitions? There is the case where a disciple of the noble ones abandons wrong livelihood and maintains his life with right livelihood. This is the right livelihood with effluents, siding with merit, resulting in acquisitions.

And what is the right livelihood that is noble, without effluents, transcendent, a factor of the path? The abstaining, desisting, abstinence, avoidance of wrong livelihood in one developing the noble path whose mind is noble, whose mind is without effluents, who is fully possessed of the noble path. (...)

The early canonical texts state right livelihood as avoiding and abstaining from wrong livelihood. This virtue is further explained in Buddhist texts, states Vetter, as "living from begging, but not accepting everything and not possessing more than is strictly necessary". For lay Buddhists, this precept requires that the livelihood avoid causing suffering to sentient beings by cheating them, or harming or killing them in any way.

The Anguttara Nikaya III.208 asserts that the right livelihood does not trade in weapons, living beings, meat, alcoholic drink or poison. The same text, in section V.177, asserts that this applies to lay Buddhists. This has meant, states Harvey, that raising and trading cattle livestock for slaughter is a breach of "right livelihood" precept in the Buddhist tradition, and Buddhist countries lack the mass slaughter houses found in Western countries.

=== Right effort ===
Right effort (samyag-vyāyāma / sammā-vāyāma) is preventing the arising of unwholesome states, and the generation of wholesome states. This includes indriya-samvara, "guarding the sense-doors", restraint of the sense faculties. Right effort is presented in the Pali Canon, such as the Sacca-vibhanga Sutta, as follows:

And what is right effort?

Here the monk arouses his will, puts forth effort, generates energy, exerts his mind, and strives to prevent the arising of evil and unwholesome mental states that have not yet arisen.
He arouses his will... and strives to eliminate evil and unwholesome mental states that have already arisen. He arouses his will... and strives to generate wholesome mental states that have not yet arisen.
He arouses his will, puts forth effort, generates energy, exerts his mind, and strives to maintain wholesome mental states that have already arisen, to keep them free of delusion, to develop, increase, cultivate, and perfect them.

This is called right effort.

The unwholesome states (akusala) are described in the Buddhist texts are related to thoughts, emotions, intentions. These include the pancanivarana (five hindrances), that is, sensual thoughts, doubts about the path, restlessness, drowsiness, and ill will of any kind. Of these, the Buddhist traditions consider sensual thoughts and ill will needing more right effort. Sensual desire that must be eliminated by effort includes anything related to sights, sounds, smells, tastes and touch. This is to be done by restraint of the sense faculties (indriya-samvara). Ill will that must be eliminated by effort includes any form of aversion including hatred, anger, resentment towards anything or anyone.

=== Right mindfulness ===
While originally, in Yogic practice, sati may have meant to remember the meditation object, to cultivate a deeply absorbed, secluded state of mind, in the oldest Buddhism it has the meaning of "retention", being mindful of the dhammas (both wholesome states of mind, and teachings and practices that remind of those wholesome states of mind) that are beneficial to the Buddhist path. According to Gethin, sati is a quality that guards or watches over the mind; the stronger it becomes, the weaker unwholesome states of mind become, weakening their power "to take over and dominate thought, word and deed." According to Frauwallner, mindfulness was a means to prevent the arising of craving, which resulted simply from contact between the senses and their objects. According to Frauwallner this may have been the Buddha's original idea. According to Trainor, mindfulness aids one not to crave and cling to any transitory state or thing, by complete and constant awareness of phenomena as impermanent, suffering and without self. Gethin refers to the Milindapanha, which states that sati brings to mind the dhammas and their beneficial or unbeneficial qualities, aiding the removal of unbeneficial dhammas and the strengthening of beneficial dhammas. Gethin further notes that sati makes one aware of the "full range and extent of dhammas", that is, the relation between things, broadening one's view and understanding.

The Satipatthana Sutta describes the contemplation of four domains, namely body, feelings, mind and phenomena. (Note: The formula is repeated in other sutras, for example the Sacca-vibhanga Sutta (MN 141): "And what is right mindfulness? Here the monk remains contemplating the body as body, resolute, aware and mindful, having put aside worldly desire and sadness; he remains contemplating feelings as feelings; he remains contemplating mental states as mental states; he remains contemplating mental objects as mental objects, resolute, aware and mindful, having put aside worldly desire and sadness; This is called right mindfulness.") The Satipatthana Sutta is regarded by the vipassana movement as the quintessential text on Buddhist meditation, taking cues from it on "bare attention" and the contemplation on the observed phenomena as dukkha, anatta and anicca. (Note: From The Way of Mindfulness, The Satipatthana Sutta and Its Commentary, Soma Thera (1998), (...) For the dull-witted man of the theorizing type [ditthi carita] it is convenient to see consciousness [citta] in the fairly simple way it is set forth in this discourse, by way of impermanence [aniccata], and by way of such divisions as mind-with-lust [saragadi vasena], in order to reject the notion of permanence [nicca sañña] in regard to consciousness. Consciousness is a special condition [visesa karana] for the wrong view due to a basic belief in permanence [niccanti abhinivesa vatthutaya ditthiya]. The contemplation on consciousness, the Third Arousing of Mindfulness, is the Path to Purity of this type of man. For the keen-witted man of the theorizing type it is convenient to see mental objects or things [dhamma], according to the manifold way set forth in this discourse, by way of perception, sense-impression and so forth [nivaranadi vasena], in order to reject the notion of a soul [atta sañña] in regard to mental things. Mental things are special conditions for the wrong view due to a basic belief in a soul [attanti abhinivesa vatthutaya ditthiya]. For this type of man the contemplation on mental objects, the Fourth Arousing of Mindfulness, is the Path to Purity. (...)) (Note: Vetter and Bronkhorst note that the path starts with right view, which includes insight into anicca, dukkha and anatta.) According to Grzegorz Polak, the four upassanā have been misunderstood by the developing Buddhist tradition, including Theravada, to refer to four different foundations. According to Polak, the four upassanā do not refer to four different foundations of which one should be aware, but are an alternate description of the jhanas, describing how the samskharas are tranquilized:

- the six sense-bases which one needs to be aware of (kāyānupassanā);
- contemplation on vedanās, which arise with the contact between the senses and their objects (vedanānupassanā);
- the altered states of mind to which this practice leads (cittānupassanā);
- the development from the five hindrances to the seven factors of enlightenment (dhammānupassanā). (Note: Note how kāyānupassanā, vedanānupassanā, and cittānupassanā, resemble the five skandhas and the chain of causation as described in the middle part of Pratītyasamutpāda; while dhammānupassanā refers to mindfulness as retention, calling into mind the beneficial dhammas which are applied to analyse phenomena, and counter the arising of disturbing thoughts and emotions.)

In the vipassana movement, mindfulness (samyak-smṛti / sammā-sati) is interpreted as "bare attention": never be absent minded, being conscious of what one is doing. Rupert Gethin notes that the contemporary vipassana movement interprets the Satipatthana Sutta as "describing a pure form of insight (vipassanā) meditation" for which samatha (calm) and dhyāna are not necessary. Yet, in pre-sectarian Buddhism, the establishment of mindfulness was placed before the practice of the Dhyāna, and associated with the abandonment of the five hindrances and the entry into the first Dhyāna. (Note: Gethin: "The sutta is often read today as describing a pure form of insight (vipassanā) meditation that bypasses calm (samatha) meditation and the four absorptions (dhyāna), as outlined in the description of the Buddhist path found, for example, in the Samaññaphala Sutta [...]. The earlier tradition, however, seems not to have always read it this way, associating accomplishment in the exercise of establishing mindfulness with abandoning of the five hindrances and the first absorption.")

The dhyāna-scheme describes mindfulness also as appearing in the third and fourth dhyāna, after initial concentration of the mind. (Note: Original publication: Gombrich, Richard (2007). Religious Experience in Early Buddhism. OCHS Library. Archived from the original on 1 July 2016.) Gombrich and Wynne note that, while the second dhyāna denotes a state of absorption, in the third and fourth dhyāna one comes out of this absorption, being mindfully aware of objects while being indifferent to them. (Note: Original publication: Gombrich, Richard (2007). Religious Experience in Early Buddhism. OCHS Library. Archived from the original on 1 July 2016.) According to Gombrich, "the later tradition has falsified the jhana by classifying them as the quintessence of the concentrated, calming kind of meditation, ignoring the other – and indeed higher – element".

=== Right samadhi (unification of mind) ===
==== Samadhi ====
Samadhi (samyak-samādhi / sammā-samādhi) is a common practice or goal in Indian religions. The term samadhi derives from the root sam-a-dha, which means "to collect" or "bring together". It is often translated as "concentration" or "unification of mind". In the early Buddhist texts, samadhi is also associated with the term "samatha" (calm abiding).

==== Dhyana ====
Bronkhorst notes that neither the Four Noble Truths nor the Noble Eightfold Path discourse provide details of right samadhi. Several Suttas, such as the following in Saccavibhanga Sutta, equate it with dhyana:

And what is right concentration?

[i] Here, the monk, detached from sense-desires, detached from unwholesome states, enters and remains in the first jhana (level of concentration, Sanskrit: dhyāna), in which there is applied and sustained thinking, together with joy and pleasure born of detachment;
[ii] And through the subsiding of applied and sustained thinking, with the gaining of inner stillness and oneness of mind, he enters and remains in the second jhana, which is without applied and sustained thinking, and in which there are joy and pleasure born of concentration;
[iii] And through the fading of joy, he remains equanimous, mindful and aware, and he experiences in his body the pleasure of which the Noble Ones say: "equanimous, mindful and dwelling in pleasure", and thus he enters and remains in the third jhana;
[iv] And through the giving up of pleasure and pain, and through the previous disappearance of happiness and sadness, he enters and remains in the fourth jhana, which is without pleasure and pain, and in which there is pure equanimity and mindfulness.

This is called right concentration.

Bronkhorst has questioned the historicity and chronology of the description of the four jhanas. Bronkhorst states that this path may be similar to what the Buddha taught, but the details and the form of the description of the jhanas in particular, and possibly other factors, is likely the work of later scholasticism. Bronkhorst notes that description of the third jhana cannot have been formulated by the Buddha, since it includes the phrase "Noble Ones say", quoting earlier Buddhists, indicating it was formulated by later Buddhists. It is likely that later Buddhist scholars incorporated this, then attributed the details and the path, particularly the insights at the time of liberation, to have been discovered by the Buddha. Based on a comparative study or early Buddhist discourses, Bhikkhu Anālayo argues that the idea of right concentration was originally about cultivating concentration, whatever its depth, in collaboration with the other seven path factors, and that the identification of right concentration with the four absorptions appears to be a later development.

==== Concentration ====
In the Theravada tradition, samadhi is interpreted as concentration on a meditation object. Buddhagosa defines samadhi as "the centering of consciousness and consciousness concomitants evenly and rightly on a single object...the state in virtue of which consciousness and its concomitants remain evenly and rightly on a single object, undistracted and unscattered."

According to Henepola Gunaratana, in the suttas samadhi is defined as one-pointedness of mind (Cittass'ekaggatā). According to Bhikkhu Bodhi, the right concentration factor is reaching a one-pointedness of mind and unifying all mental factors, but it is not the same as "a gourmet sitting down to a meal, or a soldier on the battlefield" who also experience one-pointed concentration. The difference is that the latter have a one-pointed object in focus with complete awareness directed to that object – the meal or the target, respectively. In contrast, right concentration meditative factor in Buddhism is a state of awareness without any object or subject, and ultimately unto no-thingness and emptiness, as articulated in apophatic discourse.

==== Development into equanimity ====
Although often translated as "concentration", as in the limiting of the attention of the mind on one object, in the fourth dhyana "equanimity and mindfulness remain", and the practice of concentration-meditation may well have been incorporated from non-Buddhist traditions. Vetter notes that samadhi consists of the four stages of awakening, but

...to put it more accurately, the first dhyana seems to provide, after some time, a state of strong concentration, from which the other stages come forth; the second stage is called samadhija.

Gombrich and Wynne note that, while the second jhana denotes a state of absorption, in the third and fourth jhana one comes out of this absorption, being mindfully awareness of objects while being indifferent to it. According to Gombrich, "the later tradition has falsified the jhana by classifying them as the quintessence of the concentrated, calming kind of meditation, ignoring the other – and indeed higher – element."

=== Liberation ===
Following the Noble Eightfold Path leads to liberation in the form of nirvana:

And what is that ancient path, that ancient road, traveled by the Rightly Self-awakened Ones of former times? Just this noble eightfold path: right view, right aspiration, right speech, right action, right livelihood, right effort, right mindfulness, right concentration. That is the ancient path, the ancient road, traveled by the Rightly Self-awakened Ones of former times. I followed that path. Following it, I came to direct knowledge of aging & death, direct knowledge of the origination of aging & death, direct knowledge of the cessation of aging & death, direct knowledge of the path leading to the cessation of aging & death. I followed that path. Following it, I came to direct knowledge of birth... becoming... clinging... craving... feeling... contact... the six sense media... name-&-form... consciousness, direct knowledge of the origination of consciousness, direct knowledge of the cessation of consciousness, direct knowledge of the path leading to the cessation of consciousness. I followed that path.

— The Buddha, Nagara Sutta, Samyutta Nikaya ii.124, Translated by Thanissaro Bhikkhu

== Practice ==
=== Order of practice ===
Vetter notes that originally the path culminated in the practice of dhyana/samadhi as the core soteriological practice. According to the Pali and Chinese canon, the samadhi state (right concentration) is dependent on the development of preceding path factors:

The Blessed One said: "Now what, monks, is noble right concentration with its supports and requisite conditions? Any singleness of mind equipped with these seven factors – right view, right resolve, right speech, right action, right livelihood, right effort, and right mindfulness – is called noble right concentration with its supports and requisite conditions.

— Maha-cattarisaka Sutta

According to the discourses, right view, right resolve, right speech, right action, right livelihood, right effort, and right mindfulness are used as the support and requisite conditions for the practice of right concentration. Understanding of the right view is the preliminary role, and is also the forerunner of the entire Noble Eightfold Path.

According to the modern Theravada monk and scholar Walpola Rahula, the divisions of the noble eightfold path "are to be developed more or less simultaneously, as far as possible according to the capacity of each individual. They are all linked together and each helps the cultivation of the others." Bhikkhu Bodhi explains that these factors are not sequential, but components, and "with a certain degree of progress all eight factors can be present simultaneously, each supporting the others. However, until that point is reached, some sequence in the unfolding of the path is inevitable."

The stage in the Path where there is no more learning in Yogachara Abhidharma, state Buswell and Gimello, is identical to Nirvana or Buddhahood, the ultimate goal in Buddhism.

=== Sila-samadhi-prajna ===
The Noble Eightfold Path is sometimes divided into three basic divisions, with right view and right resolve concluding the sequence:

Division	Eightfold Path factors
Moral virtue (Sanskrit: śīla, Pāli: sīla)	1. Right speech
Moral virtue (Sanskrit: śīla, Pāli: sīla)	2. Right action
Moral virtue (Sanskrit: śīla, Pāli: sīla)	3. Right livelihood
Meditation (Sanskrit and Pāli: samādhi)	4. Right effort
Meditation (Sanskrit and Pāli: samādhi)	5. Right mindfulness
Meditation (Sanskrit and Pāli: samādhi)	6. Right concentration
Insight, wisdom (Sanskrit: prajñā, Pāli: paññā)	7. Right view
Insight, wisdom (Sanskrit: prajñā, Pāli: paññā)	8. Right resolve

This order is a later development, when discriminating insight (prajna) became central to Buddhist soteriology, and came to be regarded as the culmination of the Buddhist path. Yet, Majjhima Nikaya 117, Mahācattārīsaka Sutta, describes the first seven practices as requisites for right samadhi. According to Vetter, this may have been the original soteriological practice in early Buddhism.

The "moral virtues" (Sanskrit: śīla, Pāli: sīla) group consists of three paths: right speech, right action and right livelihood. The word sīla, though translated by English writers as linked to "morals or ethics", states Bhikkhu Bodhi, is in ancient and medieval Buddhist commentary tradition closer to the concept of discipline and disposition that "leads to harmony at several levels – social, psychological, karmic and contemplative". Such harmony creates an environment to pursue the meditative steps in the Noble Eightfold Path by reducing social disorder, preventing inner conflict that result from transgressions, favoring future karma-triggered movement through better rebirths, and purifying the mind.

The meditation group ("samadhi") of the path progresses from moral restraints to training the mind. Right effort and mindfulness calm the mind-body complex, releasing unwholesome states and habitual patterns and encouraging the development of wholesome states and non-automatic responses, the bojjhaṅga (seven factors of awakening). The practice of dhyāna reinforces these developments, leading to upekkhā (equanimity) and mindfulness. According to the Theravada commentarial tradition and the contemporary vipassana movement, the goal in this group of the Noble Eightfold Path is to develop clarity and insight into the nature of reality – dukkha, anicca and anatta, discard negative states and dispel avidya (ignorance), ultimately attaining nirvana.

In the threefold division, prajna (insight, wisdom) is presented as the culmination of the path, whereas in the eightfold division the path starts with correct knowledge or insight, which is needed to understand why this path should be followed.

== Schools of Buddhism and their views of the Eightfold Path ==
=== Theravada presentations of the path ===
Theravada Buddhism is a diverse tradition and thus includes different explanations of the path to awakening. However, the teachings of the Buddha are often encapsulated by Theravadins in the basic framework of the Four Noble Truths and the Eighthfold Path.

Some Theravada Buddhists also follow the presentation of the path laid out in Buddhaghosa's Visuddhimagga. This presentation is known as the "Seven Purifications" (satta-visuddhi). This schema and its accompanying outline of "insight knowledges" (vipassanā-ñāṇa) is used by modern influential Theravadin scholars, such Mahasi Sayadaw (in his "The Progress of Insight") and Nyanatiloka Thera (in "The Buddha's Path to Deliverance").

=== Mahayana presentations of the path ===
Mahāyāna Buddhism is based principally upon the path of a Bodhisattva. A Bodhisattva refers to one who is on the path to buddhahood. The term Mahāyāna was originally a synonym for Bodhisattvayāna or "Bodhisattva Vehicle".

In the earliest texts of Mahāyāna Buddhism, the path of a bodhisattva was to awaken the bodhicitta. Between the 1st and 3rd century CE, this tradition introduced the Ten Bhumi doctrine, which means ten levels or stages of awakening. This development was followed by the acceptance that it is impossible to achieve Buddhahood in one (current) lifetime, and the best goal is not nirvana for oneself, but Buddhahood after climbing through the ten levels during multiple rebirths. Mahāyāna scholars then outlined an elaborate path, for monks and laypeople, and the path includes the vow to help teach Buddhist knowledge to other beings, so as to help them cross samsara and liberate themselves, once one reaches the Buddhahood in a future rebirth. One part of this path are the pāramitā (perfections, to cross over), derived from the Jatakas tales of Buddha's numerous rebirths.

The doctrine of the bodhisattva bhūmis was also eventually merged with the Sarvāstivāda Vaibhāṣika schema of the "five paths" by the Yogacara school. This Mahāyāna "five paths" presentation can be seen in Asanga's Mahāyānasaṃgraha.

The Mahāyāna texts are inconsistent in their discussion of the pāramitās, and some texts include lists of two, others four, six, ten and fifty-two. The six paramitas have been most studied, and these are:

1. Dāna pāramitā: perfection of giving; primarily to monks, nuns and the Buddhist monastic establishment dependent on the alms and gifts of the lay householders, in return for generating religious merit; some texts recommend ritually transferring the merit so accumulated for better rebirth to someone else
2. Śīla pāramitā: perfection of morality; it outlines ethical behaviour for both the laity and the Mahayana monastic community; this list is similar to Śīla in the Eightfold Path (i.e. Right Speech, Right Action, Right Livelihood)
3. Kṣānti pāramitā: perfection of patience, willingness to endure hardship
4. Vīrya pāramitā: perfection of vigour; this is similar to Right Effort in the Eightfold Path
5. Dhyāna pāramitā: perfection of meditation; this is similar to Right Concentration in the Eightfold Path
6. Prajñā pāramitā: perfection of insight (wisdom), awakening to the characteristics of existence such as karma, rebirths, impermanence, no-self, dependent origination and emptiness; this is complete acceptance of the Buddha teaching, then conviction, followed by ultimate realisation that "dharmas are non-arising".

In Mahāyāna Sutras that include ten pāramitā, the additional four perfections are "skillful means, vow, power and knowledge". The most discussed pāramitā and the highest rated perfection in Mahayana texts is the "Prajna-paramita", or the "perfection of insight". This insight in the Mahāyāna tradition, states Shōhei Ichimura, has been the "insight of non-duality or the absence of reality in all things".

==== East Asian Buddhism ====
East Asian Buddhism is influenced by both the classic Indian Buddhist presentations of the path such as the Eightfold Path as well as classic Indian Mahāyāna presentations such as that found in the Da zhidu lun.

There are many different presentations of soteriology, including numerous paths and vehicles (yanas) in the different traditions of East Asian Buddhism. There is no single dominant presentation. In Zen Buddhism for example, one can find outlines of the path such as the Two Entrances and Four Practices, The Five ranks, The Ten Ox-Herding Pictures and the Three Mysterious Gates of Linji.

==== Indo-Tibetan Buddhism ====
In Indo-Tibetan Buddhism, the path to liberation is outlined in the genre known as Lamrim ("Stages of the Path"). All the various Tibetan schools have their own Lamrim presentations. This genre can be traced to Atiśa's 11th-century A Lamp for the Path to Enlightenment (Bodhipathapradīpa).

== Cognitive psychology ==
The noble eightfold path has been compared to cognitive psychology; Gil Fronsdal says the right view factor can be interpreted to mean how one's mind views the world, and how that leads to patterns of thought, intention and actions. Peter Randall states that it is the seventh factor or right mindfulness that may be thought in terms of cognitive psychology, wherein the change in thought and behavior are linked.

== See also ==
- Ashtanga (eight limbs of yoga)
- Bodhipakkhiyādhammā (thirty-seven qualities for awakening)
- Four Right Exertions
- Mangala Sutta
- Trikaya (body, speech and mind)

== Sources ==
=== Primary sources ===
- Bodhi, Bhikkhu (1999). The Noble Eightfold Path: The Way to the End of Suffering. Archived from the original on 28 August 2019.
- Carter, John Ross and Palihawadana, Mahinda; tr. Buddhism: The Dhammapada. New York: History Book Club, 1992.
- Ñanamoli Thera (tr.) & Bhikkhu Bodhi (ed., rev.) (1991). The Discourse on Right View: The Sammaditthi Sutta and its Commentary Archived 10 October 2007 at the Wayback Machine (The Wheel Publication No. 377/379; includes translations of MN 9 and the associated commentary from the Papañcasudani). Kandy: Buddhist Publication Society. Retrieved 22 September 2007 from "Access to Insight" (1994).
- Nyanasobhano, Bhikkhu (1989). Two Dialogues on Dhamma Archived 25 February 2008 at the Wayback Machine (Wheel No. 363/364). Kandy: BPS. Retrieved 4 February 2008 from "Access to Insight" (2005)
- Rahula, Walpola. What the Buddha Taught. New York: Grove Press, 1974. ISBN 0-8021-3031-3.
- Rewata Dhamma. The First Discourse of the Buddha. Somerville, Massachusetts: Wisdom Publications, 1997. ISBN 0-86171-104-1.
- Snelling, John. The Buddhist Handbook: A Complete Guide to Buddhist Schools, Teaching, Practice, and History. Rochester: Inner Traditions, 1991. ISBN.
- Sri Lanka Buddha Jayanti Tipitaka Series (SLTP) (n.d.), Avijjāvaggo Archived 20 March 2013 at the Wayback Machine, (SN 44 [Sinhalese ed.], ch. 1, in Pali). Retrieved on 16 July 2007 from "Mettanet – Lanka"

=== Secondary sources ===
- Analayo, Bhikkhu (2011), "Right View and the Scheme of the Four Truths in Early Buddhism − The Samyukta-āgama Parallel to the Sammādimmhi-sutta and the Simile of the Four Skills of a Physician", Canadian Journal of Buddhist Studies (7), archived from the original on 20 November 2022
- Anderson, Carol (2013). Pain and Its Ending: The Four Noble Truths in the Theravada Buddhist Canon. Routledge. ISBN 978-1-136-81325-2.
- Alexander Berzin (2007), "The Eightfold Noble Path" Archived 1 March 2017 at the Wayback Machine
- Bronkhorst, Johannes (1993). The Two Traditions of Meditation in Ancient India. Motilal Banarsidass Publ.
- Bucknell, Rod (1984). "The Buddhist to Liberation: An Analysis of the Listing of Stages". The Journal of the International Association of Buddhist Studies. 7 (2). Archived from the original on 25 May 2017.
- Bucknell, Roderick & Stuart-Fox, Martin (1986). The Twilight Language: Explorations in Buddhist Meditation and Symbolism. Curzon Press: London. ISBN 0-312-82540-4
- Buswell, Robert E. (2004). Encyclopedia of Buddhism: A-L. Macmillan Reference. ISBN 978-0-02-865719-6.
- Bhikkhu Bodhi (1998). The Noble Eightfold Path: Way to the End of Suffering (PDF). Buddhist Publication Society. ISBN 9789552401169. Archived (PDF) from the original on 26 November 2020.
- Buswell, Robert E. Jr; Gimello, Robert M., eds. (1994). Paths to Liberation. The Marga and its Transformations in Buddhist Thought. Delhi: Motilal Banarsidass Publishers.
- Buswell, Robert E. Jr.; Lopez, Donald Jr. (2003). The Princeton Dictionary of Buddhism. Princeton University Press.
- Choong, Mun-keat (2000). The Fundamental Teachings of Early Buddhism: A Comparative Study Based on the Sutranga Portion of the Pali Samyutta-Nikaya and the Chinese Samyuktagama. Otto Harrassowitz Verlag.
- Chryssides, George; Wilkins, Margaret (2006). A Reader in New Religious Movements. A&C Black. ISBN 978-0-8264-6167-4.
- Conze, Edward (2001), The Perfection of Wisdom in Eight Thousand Lines and its Verse Summary, Grey Fox Press, ISBN 978-0-87704-049-1
- Eliot, Charles (2014). Japanese Buddhism. Routledge. ISBN 978-1-317-79274-1.
- Fuller, Paul (2005). The Notion of Ditthi in Theravada Buddhism. RoutledgeCurzon.
- Gethin, Rupert (1998). Foundations of Buddhism. Oxford University Press.
- Gethin, R.M.L. (2003) [1992]. The Buddhist Path to Awakening. OneWorld Publications.
- Richard Gombrich (2009). What the Buddha thought. Equinox. ISBN 978-1-84553-614-5.
- Gunaratana, Henepola (2001). Eight Mindful Steps to Happiness: Walking the Buddha's Path. Wisdom Publications. ISBN 0-86171-176-9.
- Gyatso, Geshe Kelsang (1995), Introduction to Buddhism: An Explanation of the Buddhist Way of Life, Tharpa Publications, ISBN 978-0-9789067-7-1
- Harvey, Graham (2016). Religions in Focus: New Approaches to Tradition and Contemporary Practices. Routledge.
- Harvey, Peter (2013). An Introduction to Buddhism. Cambridge University Press.
- Hirakawa, Akira (1990). A History of Indian Buddhism. From Sakyamuni to Early Mahayana. University of Hawai'i Press. hdl:10125/23030.
- Hirakawa, Akira (1993), Groner, Paul (ed.), A History of Indian Buddhism: From Śākyamuni to Early Mahāyāna, translated by Groner, Paul, Delhi: Motilal Banarsidass, ISBN 978-81-208-0955-0, archived from the original on 11 January 2023
- Kalupahana, David J. (1992). A history of Buddhist philosophy. Delhi: Motilal Banarsidass Publishers Private Limited.
- Keown, Damien (2000). Buddhism: A Very Short Introduction (Kindle ed.). Oxford University Press.
- Keown, Damien (2003), Dictionary of Buddhism, Oxford University Press, ISBN 978-0-19-157917-2
- Kohn, Michael H.; tr. The Shambhala Dictionary of Buddhism and Zen. Boston: Shambhala, 1991.
- Lopez, Donald S (1995). Buddhism in Practice (PDF). Princeton University Press. ISBN 0-691-04442-2.
- Lopez, Donald, jr. (2009). Buddhism and Science: A Guide for the Perplexed. University of Chicago Press.
- Nattier, Jan (2003), A Few Good Men: The Bodhisattva Path according to The Inquiry of Ugra (Ugrapariprccha), University of Hawai'i Press, ISBN 978-0-8248-2607-9
- Niimi, J. Buddhism and Cognitive Science. Retrieved 8 July 2006.
- Thera, Nyanaponika (30 November 2013). The Power of Mindfulness: An Inquiry into the Scope of Bare Attention and the Principal Sources of its Strength. Access to Insight. Archived from the original on 5 August 2019.
- Polak, Grzegorz (2011). Reexamining Jhana: Towards a Critical Reconstruction of Early Buddhist Soteriology. UMCS.
- Prebish, Charles (2000). "From Monastic Ethics to Modern Society". In Keown, Damien (ed.). Contemporary Buddhist Ethics. Routledge Curzon.
- Rahula, Walpola (2007). What the Buddha Taught. Grove Press.
- Raju, P. T. (1985). Structural Depths of Indian Thought. State University of New York Press. ISBN 978-0-88706-139-4.
- Robinson, Richard H.; Johnson, Willard L. (1997). Buddhist Religions: A Historical Introduction (4th ed.). Wadsworth Publishing. ISBN 978-0-534-55858-1.
- Sharf, Robert M. (2014), "Mindfulness and mindlessness in early Chan" (PDF), Philosophy East and West, 64 (4): 933–964, doi:10.1353/pew.2014.0074, S2CID 144208166, archived (PDF) from the original on 27 April 2021
- Spiro, Melford E. (1982). Buddhism and Society: A Great Tradition and Its Burmese Vicissitudes. University of California Press.
- Sujato, Bhante (2012), A History of Mindfulness (PDF), Santipada, ISBN 9781921842092, archived (PDF) from the original on 23 November 2018
- Velez de Cea, J. Abraham (2013). The Buddha and Religious Diversity. Routledge. ISBN 978-1-135-10039-1.
- Vetter, Tilmann (1988). The Ideas and Meditative Practices of Early Buddhism. BRILL. ISBN 90-04-08959-4.
- Wei-hsün Fu, Charles; Wawrytko, Sandra Ann (1994). Buddhist Behavioral Codes and the Modern World: An International Symposium. Greenwood. ISBN 978-0-313-28890-6.
- Williams, Paul (2000). Mahayana Buddhism: The Doctrinal Foundations. Routledge.
- Williams, Paul (2002). Buddhist Thought (Kindle ed.). Taylor & Francis.
- Williams, Paul; Tribe, Anthony; Wynne, Alexander (2012). Buddhist Thought. Routledge. ISBN 978-1-136-52088-4.

Web-sources
