= Indriya =

Phenomenological faculties in Indian religions

Indriya (literally "belonging to or agreeable to Indra") is the Sanskrit and Pali term for physical strength or ability in general, and for and specifically refers to the five spiritual faculties, the five or six sensory faculties, and the twenty-two phenomenological faculties. (Note: Bodhi (2000) translates indriya as "spiritual faculty" and, at times (particularly when referring to Abhidhammic sources), "faculty." Buddhaghosa & Ñāṇamoli (1999) consistently translate indriya simply as "faculty" both in the context of the five spiritual faculties (e.g., pp. 128-9) and the 22 phenomenological faculties (Ch. XVI). Conze (1993) mentions and uses translations of "faculty," "controlling faculty" and "spiritual faculty," and refers to the five indriya as "cardinal virtues." Thanissaro (1998) uses "faculty." Rhys Davids & Stede (1921-25), p. 122-123, entry for "Indriya," (retrieved 2007-05-27) defines it as: "Indriya is one of the most comprehensive & important categories of Buddhist psychological philosophy & ethics, meaning 'controlling principle, directive force, élan, dynamis'...: (a) with reference to sense-perceptibility 'faculty, function'....")

== Etymology ==
Indriya, literally "belonging to or agreeable to Indra," chief deity in the Rig Veda and lord of the Trāyastriṃśa heaven (also known as Śakra or Sakka in Buddhism), hence connoting supremacy, dominance and control, attested in the general meaning of "power, strength" from the Rig Veda.

In Buddhist Sanskrit and Pali the term generally refers to physical strength or ability in general, and more specifically to the five spiritual faculties, the five or six sensory faculties, or the twenty-two phenomenological faculties.

== Five spiritual faculties ==
In the Pali Canon's Sutta Pitaka, the "five spiritual faculties" (Pali: pañc' indriyāni), which contribute to an awake state of mind, are:

- faith or conviction or belief (saddhā)
- energy or persistence or perseverance (viriya)
- mindfulness or memory (sati)
- stillness (samādhi)
- wisdom or understanding or comprehension (paññā).

SN 48.10 is one of several discourses that characterizes these spiritual faculties in the following manner:

- Faith/conviction is faith in the Buddha's awakening.
- Energy/persistence refers to exertion towards the Four Right Efforts.
- Mindfulness refers to focusing on the four satipaṭṭhāna.
- Samādhi, stillness refers to achieving the four jhānas.
- Wisdom/understanding refers to discerning the Four Noble Truths.

In SN 48.51, the Buddha declares that, of these five faculties, wisdom is the "chief" (agga).

The five faculties are listed in the seven sets of qualities lauded by the Buddha as conducive to Enlightenment.

=== Balancing the five faculties ===
In AN 6.55, the Buddha counsels a discouraged monk, Sona, to balance or "tune" his spiritual faculties as one would a musical instrument:

"... what do you think: when the strings of your [lute] were neither too taut nor too loose, but tuned to be right on pitch, was your [lute] in tune & playable?"

"Yes, lord."

"In the same way, Sona, over-aroused persistence leads to restlessness, overly slack persistence leads to laziness. Thus you should determine the right pitch for your persistence, attune the pitch of the [five] faculties [to that], and there pick up your theme."

Relatedly, the Visuddhimagga and other post-canonical Pali commentaries caution against one spiritual faculty overpowering and inhibiting the other four faculties, and thus generally recommend modifying the overpowering faculty with the investigation of states (see dhamma vicaya) or the development of tranquillity (samatha). Moreover, these commentaries especially recommend that the five spiritual faculties be developed in counterbalancing dyads:

Mindfulness
Faith	Under- standing
Energy	Concen- tration
Mindfulness
The balancing of the five spiritual faculties.

- "For one strong in faith and weak in understanding has confidence uncritically and groundlessly. One strong in understanding and weak in faith errs on the side of cunning and is as hard to cure as one sick of a disease caused by medicine. With the balancing of the two a man has confidence only when there are grounds for it." (Vism. Ch. IV, §47, ¶1)
- "... [I]dleness overpowers one strong in concentration and weak in energy, since concentration favours idleness. Agitation overpowers one strong in energy and weak in concentration, since energy favours agitation. But concentration coupled with energy cannot lapse into idleness, and energy coupled with concentration cannot lapse into agitation. So these two should be balanced; for absorption comes with the balancing of the two." (Vism. Ch. IV, §47, ¶2)
- "... One working on concentration needs strong faith, since it is with such faith and confidence that he reaches absorption." (Vism. Ch. IV, §48)
- "... Then there is [balancing of] concentration and understanding. One working on concentration needs strong unification, since that is how he reaches absorption; and one working on insight needs strong understanding, since that is how he reaches penetration of characteristics; but with the balancing of the two he reaches absorption as well." (Vism. Ch. IV, §48)

The commentator Buddhaghosa adds:

- "Strong mindfulness, however, is needed in all instances; for mindfulness protects the mind lapsing into agitation through faith, energy and understanding, which favour agitation, and from lapsing into idleness through concentration, which favours idleness." (Vism. Ch. IV, §49).

=== Relation to the Five Powers ===
In SN 48.43, the Buddha declares that the five spiritual faculties are the Five Powers and vice versa. He uses the metaphor of a stream passing by a mid-stream island; the island creates two streams, but the streams can also be seen as one and the same. The Pali commentaries remark that these five qualities are "faculties" when used to control their spheres of influence, and are "powers" when unshakeable by opposing forces.

== Five material or six sensory faculties ==
In the Sutta Pitaka, six sensory faculties are referenced in a manner similar to the six saḷāyatana ('centers of experience', 'six sense bases'). These faculties consist of the five senses with the addition of "mind" or "thought" (mana).

1. vision (cakkh-indriya)
2. hearing (sot-indriya)
3. smell (ghān-indriya)
4. taste (jivh-indriya)
5. touch (kāy-indriya)
6. thought (man-indriya)

The first five of these faculties are sometimes referenced as the five material faculties (e.g., pañcannaṃ indriyānaṃ avakanti).

== Twenty-two phenomenological faculties ==
In the Abhidhamma Pitaka, the notion of indriya is expanded to the twenty-two "phenomenological faculties" or "controlling powers" (Pali: bāvīsati indriyāni) which are:

- six sensory faculties

1. eye/vision faculty (cakkh-indriya)
2. ear/hearing faculty (sot-indriya)
3. nose/smell faculty (ghān-indriya)
4. tongue/taste faculty (jivh-indriya)
5. body/sensibility faculty (kāy-indriya)
6. mind faculty (man-indriya)

- three physical faculties

1. femininity (itth-indriya)
2. masculinity (puris-indriya)
3. life or vitality (jīvit-indriya)

- five feeling faculties

1. physical pleasure (sukh-indriya)
2. physical pain (dukkh-indriya)
3. mental joy (somanassa-indriya)
4. mental grief (domanass-indriya)
5. equanimity (upekhha-indriya)

- five spiritual faculties

1. faith (saddh-indriya)
2. energy (viriy-indriya)
3. mindfulness (sat-indriya)
4. concentration (samādhi-indriya)
5. wisdom (paññ-indriya)

- three final-knowledge faculties

1. thinking "I shall know the unknown" (anaññāta-ñassāmīt-indriya)
2. gnosis (aññ-indriya)
3. one who knows (aññātā-vindriya)

According to the post-canonical Visuddhimagga, the 22 faculties along with such constructs as the aggregates, sense bases, Four Noble Truths and Dependent Origination are the "soil" of wisdom (paññā).

== Other faculty groupings ==
At times in the Pali Canon, different discourses or Abhidhammic passages will refer to different subsets of the 22 phenomenological faculties. Thus, for instance, in the Abhidhamma there are references to the "eightfold form-faculty" (aṭṭhavidhaṃ indriya-rūpaṃ) which includes the first five sensory faculties (eye, ear, nose, tongue and body faculties) plus the three physical faculties (femininity, masculinity and vitality).

== See also ==
- Ayatana (sense base)
- Bodhi (awakening, enlightenment)
- Bodhipakkhiyadhamma (37 enlightenment qualities)
- Five Powers
- Four Right Efforts
- Prajna (wisdom)
- Salayatana (six sense bases)
- Panchendriya (Indian philosophy)

== Sources ==
- Bodhi, Bhikkhu (trans.) (2000). The Connected Discourses of the Buddha: A Translation of the Samyutta Nikaya. Boston: Wisdom Publications. ISBN 0-86171-331-1.
- Buddhaghosa, Bhadantacariya & Bhikkhu Ñāṇamoli (trans.) (1999). The Path of Purification: Visuddhimagga. Seattle, WA: BPS Pariyatti Editions. ISBN 1-928706-00-2.
- Conze, Edward (1980, 1993). The Way of Wisdom: The Five Spiritual Faculties (The Wheel Publication No. 65/66). Kandy: Buddhist Publication Society. Retrieved on 2007-05-27 from "Access to Insight" at: http://www.accesstoinsight.org/lib/authors/conze/wheel065.html.
- Feldman, Christina (Jan. 5, 2023). Why Did the Buddha Cultivate Samadhi? Retrieved 2024-05-04 from "Tricycle" at https://tricycle.org/article/buddha-samadhi/.
- Nyanaponika Thera & Bhikkhu Bodhi (trans.) (1999). Numerical Discourses of the Buddha: An Anthology of Suttas from the Anguttara Nikaya. Kandy, Sri Lanka: Buddhist Publication Society. ISBN 0-7425-0405-0.
- Rhys Davids, Caroline A. F. ([1900], 2003). Buddhist Manual of Psychological Ethics, of the Fourth Century B.C., Being a Translation, now made for the First Time, from the Original Pāli, of the First Book of the Abhidhamma-Piṭaka, entitled Dhamma-Sangaṇi (Compendium of States or Phenomena). Kessinger Publishing. ISBN 0-7661-4702-9.
- Rhys Davids, T.W. & William Stede (eds.) (1921-5). The Pali Text Society's Pali–English Dictionary. Chipstead: Pali Text Society. A general on-line search engine for the PED is available at http://dsal.uchicago.edu/dictionaries/pali/.
- Shankman, Richard (2008). The Experience of Samādhi: An In-depth Exploration of Buddhist Meditation. Boston & London: Shambhala. ISBN 978-1-59030-521-8.
- Thanissaro Bhikkhu (1996, 1998). Wings to Awakening: An Anthology from the Pali Canon. Retrieved 2007-05-27 from "Access to Insight" at: http://www.accesstoinsight.org/lib/authors/thanissaro/wings/index.html.
- Thanissaro Bhikkhu (trans.) (1997a). Indriya-vibhanga Sutta: Analysis of the Mental Faculties (SN 48.10). Retrieved 2007-05-27 from "Access to Insight" at: http://www.accesstoinsight.org/tipitaka/sn/sn48/sn48.010.than.html.
- Thanissaro Bhikkhu (trans.) (1997b). Sona Sutta: About Sona (AN 6.55). Retrieved 2008-04-15 from "Access to Insight" at http://www.accesstoinsight.org/tipitaka/an/an06/an06.055.than.html.
