= Rupert Gethin =

Professor of Buddhist Studies

Rupert Mark Lovell Gethin (born 1957, in Edinburgh) is Emeritus Professor of Buddhist Studies at the University of Bristol, and (since 2003) president of the Pali Text Society. He holds a BA in Comparative Religion (1980), a master's degree in Buddhist Studies (1982), and a PhD in Buddhist Studies (1987), all from the University of Manchester. He was appointed Lecturer in Indian Religion by the University of Bristol in 1987, and then Professor in Buddhist Studies in 2009. He retired from teaching in 2023.

His main area of research is the history and development of Buddhist thought and practice in the Nikāyas and Abhidhamma. His major publications include The Buddhist Path to Awakening and Sayings of the Buddha: New translations from the Pali Nikāyas. His 1998 book The Foundations of Buddhism is frequently used in university-level classes on Buddhism in English-speaking countries.

Gethin is a practicing Buddhist. He initially studied meditation in the Samatha Trust organisation, which has its roots in the meditation practice of Nai Boonman, a former Thai Theravādin Buddhist monk. Gethin has led a class on mindfulness of breathing in Bristol since the 1990s.

== Sources ==
- Dibdin, Cara (26 November 2018), New (Free) Recordings Let the Suttas Speak for Themselves, Tricycle: The Buddhist Review
