= Satipatthana Sutta =

10th Sutta in the Majjhima Nikaya, Pāli Canon

The Satipaṭṭhāna Sutta (Note: Sanskrit: Smṛtyupasthāna Sūtra स्मृत्युपस्थान सूत्र, Chinese: 念處經) (Majjhima Nikaya 10: The Discourse on the Establishing of Mindfulness), and the subsequently created Mahāsatipaṭṭhāna Sutta (Dīgha Nikāya 22: The Great Discourse on the Establishing of Mindfulness), are two of the most celebrated and widely studied discourses in the Pāli Canon of Theravāda Buddhism, acting as the foundation for contemporary vipassanā meditation practice. The Pāli texts of the Satipaṭṭhāna Sutta and the Mahāsatipaṭṭhāna Sutta are largely similar in content; the main difference being a section about the Four Noble Truths (Catu Ariya Sacca) in the Observation of Phenomena (dhammānupassana), which is greatly expanded in the Mahāsatipaṭṭhāna Sutta. These suttas (discourses) stress the practice of sati (mindfulness) "for the purification of beings, for the overcoming of sorrow and lamentation, for the extinguishing of suffering and grief, for walking on the path of truth, for the realization of nibbāna." (Note: Famously, the Buddha declares at the beginning of this discourse: "This is the direct way [Pāli: ekāyano [...] maggo], (Note: While recognizing that ekāyano [...] maggo is "more commonly" translated as "the only path," Anālayo (2006, pp. 27-9) argues that ekāyano [...] maggo is best translated as "direct path" based on the contextual meaning of ekāyano in the Mahāsīhanāda Sutta (Majjhima Nikaya 12, Ñanamoli & Bodhi, 1994, where ekāyano describes a "one way only" path), its absence from other suttas, implications of speedy realization within the Satipaṭṭhāna Sutta itself, and commentarial elaboration. The Pali Text Society's Pali-English Dictionary (Rhys Davids & Stede, 1921-25) appears to support Anālayo's assessment in their entry for "Ayana": "ekāyano maggo leading to one goal, a direct way" (retrieved 15 May 2010 from http://dsalsrv02.uchicago.edu/cgi-bin/philologic/getobject.pl?c.0:1:2056.pali.895215).) monks, for the purification of beings, for the overcoming of sorrow and lamentation, for the extinguishing of suffering and grief, for walking on the path of truth, for the realization of nibbāna.")

== Sources ==
=== Dating ===
The Saṃyutta Nikāya (and the Saṃyukta Āgama) have a section dedicated to the topic of satipaṭṭhāna, which belong to the oldest strata of the Buddhist suttas, the elaborate Mahāsatipaṭṭhāna Sutta exists only in the Theravāda Dīgha Nikāya. Bhante Sujato postulates that the sutta was compiled from elements from other suttas as late as 20 BCE.

=== Title translation and related literature ===
satipaṭṭhāna is a compound of sati, mindfulness; and either paṭṭhāna, "foundation," or upaṭṭhāna, "presence." The compound term can be interpreted as sati-paṭṭhāna ("foundation of mindfulness") or sati-upaṭṭhāna, "presence of mindfulness". According to Bhikkhu Anālayo, the analysis of the term as sati-upaṭṭhāna, "presence of mindfulness," is a more etymologically correct derivation as upaṭṭhāna appears both throughout the Pali Canon and in the Sanskrit translation of this sutta; whereas the paṭṭhāna is only found in the Abhidhamma and post-nikaya Pali commentary.

English translations of the title, "Satipaṭṭhāna Sutta," include:

- "The Arousing of Mindfulness Discourse" (Soma, 1999)
- "The Foundations of Mindfulness Discourse" (Nyanasatta, 1994)
- "The Establishing of Mindfulness Discourse" (Thanissaro, 1995)

In regard to the prefix "Maha-" in the Pāli title of DN 22, this simply means "great," or "larger" and likely refers to DN 22's expanded section on mindfulness of the Four Noble Truths.

=== Various recensions and canonical placement ===
In the Pali Canon, the Satipaṭṭhāna Sutta is the tenth discourse in the Majjhima Nikaya (MN 10). In the Pali Text Society (PTS) edition of the Canon, this text begins on the 55th page of the first volume of its three-volume Majjhima Nikaya (M i 55).

As for the Mahāsatipaṭṭhāna Sutta, this is the 22nd discourse in the Digha Nikaya (DN 22). In the PTS edition of the Canon, the Mahāsatipaṭṭhāna Sutta begins on the 289th page of the second volume of the PTS' three-volume Digha Nikaya (D ii 289).

In the Chinese Canon, the Nian Chu Jing (念處經, Smṛtyupasthāna Sūtra), based on a Sarvastivadin source, is found on page 582 of the Taisho Tripitaka Vol. 1, Madhyama Āgama No. 26. Another similar sutra is in the Ekottara Agama (EA 12.1) and it is called the Ekayāna sutra, Direct Path sūtra.

An early Smṛtyupasthāna Sūtra version also survives inside some of the large Prajñāpāramitā sutras (Tibetan and Chinese), one of which has been translated into English by Edward Conze. These passages on mindfulness are treated as the first element in the 37 wings to awakening. According to Bhante Sujato, "This version of the satipaṭṭhāna material displays a refreshing simplicity that may indicate that it lies close to the early sources."

There does exist in Tibetan translation a "Saddharma Smṛtyupasthāna Sūtra" (dam pa'i chos dran pa nye bar bzhag pa'i mdo//dampé chödren panyé barzhak pé do) but this is a very large early Mahayana sutra and is an entirely different text. Bhante Sujato completed an extensive comparative survey of the various recensions of Sutta, entitled A History of Mindfulness.

=== Later sources ===
The Satipaṭṭhāna material, including the various meditation objects and practices, is treated in various later Abhidharma works such as the Theravada Vibhanga and Paṭisambhidāmagga, the Sarvastivada Dharmaskandha, the Jñānapraṣṭhāna, the Śāriputrābhidharma and the Arthaviniscaya Sutra.

In post-canonical Pali commentaries, the classic commentary on the Satipaṭṭhāna Sutta (as well as for the entire Majjhima Nikaya) is found in Buddhaghosa's Papañcasudani (Bullitt, 2002; Soma, 2003).

Later works, such as the Abhidharmakośakārikā of Vasubandhu, and Asanga's Yogacarabhumi and Abhidharma-samuccaya, also comment on the four satipatthanas.

== Contents ==
=== Contents of the Pali version ===
In the Satipatthana Sutta, Majjhima Nikaya 10, the Buddha identifies four "foundations of mindfulness" or "frames of reference," on which he contemplates or focusses after leaving behind the worldly life: kāyā (body), vedanā (sensations/feelings aroused by perception), cittā (mind/consciousness), and dhammas (elements of the Buddhist teachings). The sutta then gives an overview of Buddhist practices, under these four headings:

1. Kāyā (body):
  - mindfulness of breathing, calming the bodily formations (see also the Anapanasati Sutta);
  - clear comprehension of all postures and actions;
  - reflections on the repulsiveness of the body-parts;
  - reflections on the elements which are in the body: earth, water, fire, and air;
  - charnel ground contemplations;
  - in these ways, remaining focussed on the body itself; or clear comprehension of arising and vanishing with regard to the body; or sustained mindfulness of the presence of the body.
2. Vedanā (sensations/feelings aroused by perception):
  - understanding feelings as pleasant, unpleasant, or neither-pleasant-nor-unpleasant (neutral) feelings;
  - in this way, remaining focussed on feelings in themselves; or clear comprehension of arising and vanishing with regard to feelings; or sustained mindfulness of the presence of feelings.
3. Cittā (mind/consciousness), (Note: Regarding English translations of citta, Thanissaro (2000) and VRI (1996) translate it as "mind" while Nyanasatta (1994) and Soma (1999; 2003) translate it as "consciousness." Partly based on material from this discourse, Oxford-trained Dr. Sue Hamilton argues that citta is best translated as "state of mind" while viññāṇa is "consciousness of" (Hamilton, 2001, pp. 105-114).) awareness of the presence and absence of the unwholesome states of the three poisons (lust, hate, delusion); and the presence or absence of the wholesome states related to dhyana:
  - Three poisons:
    - lust (sarāgaṃ) or without lust (vītarāgaṃ)
    - hate (sadosaṃ) or without hate (vītadosaṃ)
    - delusion (samohaṃ) or without delusion (vītamohaṃ)
  - Dhyana-related factors:
    - contracted (saṅkhittaṃ) or scattered (vikkhittaṃ)
    - lofty (mahaggataṃ) or not lofty (amahaggataṃ) (Note: Mahaggata is literally "become great." According to the Pali commentary, amahaggata (not become-great) refers to the "conscious state of the plane of existence of sense experience" (kāma), while mahaggata refers to the higher planes of forms (rūpāvacara) and formlessness (arūpāvacara) (Soma, 2003, p. 115).)
    - surpassable (sa-uttaraṃ) or unsurpassed (anuttaraṃ) (Note: The commentarial treatment of anuttara ("unsurpassed") and sa-uttara ("surpassable") is similar to its analysis of mahaggata ("become great") and amahaggata ("not become great") above (Soma, 2003, p. 115).)
    - quieted (samāhitaṃ) or not quieted (asamāhitaṃ)
    - released (vimuttaṃ) or not released (avimuttaṃ)
  - In this way, remaining focussed on the mind itself; or clear comprehension of arising and vanishing with regard to mind; or sustained mindfulness of the presence of mind
4. Dhammā (elements of the Buddhist teachings): (Note: "Dhammas" is often translated as "mental objects." Anālayo (2006), pp. 182-86, points out that translating dhamma as "mental object" (or anything similar, such as "mental contents") is problematic for multiple reasons, including that the three prior satipatthāna (body, sensations, mind) can become mental objects in themselves, and that those objects (such as the hindrances, aggregates and sense bases) identified under this satipatthāna (dhamma) are far from an exhaustive list of all possible mental objects. Thus, Anālayo more closely identifies this sutta's dhamma as "mental factors and categories," "classificatory schemes," and "frameworks or points of reference to be applied during contemplation" (p. 183). Anālayo (p. 183, nn. 2, 3) quotes Gyori (1996, p. 24) as stating that contemplation of these dhamma "are specifically intended to invest the mind with a soteriological orientation," and Gombrich (1996, p. 36) as writing that contemplating these dhamma teaches one "to see the world through Buddhist spectacles." According to Sharf, in the Satipațțhāna-sutta the term sati means to remember the dharmas, whereby the true nature of phenomena can be seen. According to Paul Williams, referring to Erich Frauwallner, mindfulness provided the way to liberation, "constantly watching sensory experience in order to prevent the arising of cravings which would power future experience into rebirths." (Note: Frauwallner, E. (1973), History of Indian Philosophy, trans. V.M. Bedekar, Delhi: Motilal Banarsidass. Two volumes., pp.150 ff) According to Vetter, dhyana may have been the original core practice of the Buddha, which aided the maintenance of mindfulness.)
  - the five hindrances: awareness of the presence or absence, arising and abandoning, and no future arising, of sensual desire, ill will, sloth and torpor, restlessness and remorse, and uncertainty;
  - the five skandhas, the aggregates of clinging: the discernment of the existence, the origination, and the disappearance, of form, feeling, perception, formations (mental dispositions), and consciousness;
  - the six sense-bases, and the fetters that arise in dependence on them: discerning the internal sense-media (eye, ear, nose, tongue, body, intellect), the external sense-media (forms, sounds, odours, tangibles), the arising of fetters in dependence on the six-sense bases, the abandonment of the arisen fetters, and the future non-arising of these fetters;
  - the Seven factors of awakening: awareness of the presence or absence, the arising, and the culmination, of sati (mindfulness), dhamma vicaya (investigation of dhammas), viriya (energy, effort, persistence, determination), pīti (rapture), passaddhi (tranquility, relaxation (of body and mind)), samadhi (clear awareness, concentration), upekkha (equanimity);
  - the Four Noble Truths.

=== Comparison of the content in other sources ===
The Sarvāstivāda Smṛtyupasthāna Sūtra differs in some ways from the Theravada version, including postures as the first contemplation instead of breathing for example. According to Bhante Sujato, it seems to emphasize samatha or calm abiding, while the Theravadin version emphasizes Vipassana or insight. The text also often refers to 'bhikkhus and bhikkhunīs' instead of just male bhikkhus.

A section on Smṛtyupasthāna is found in various Tibetan and Chinese recensions of large Prajñāpāramitā sutras, such as the 25,000 line version translated by Edward Conze. This skeletal version of the Smṛtyupasthāna is incorporated into the larger sutra and thus appears as part of the Buddha's discourse to Subhuti. It only outlines specific practices for the contemplation of the body, the other three satipatthanas are simply enumerated.

Various scholars have attempted to use the numerous early sources to trace an "ur-text" i.e. the original satipaṭṭhāna formula or the earliest sutta. Bronkhorst (1985) argues that, in the earliest form of the Satipaṭṭhāna Sutta, mindfulness of feelings and mindfulness of mind were transmitted in a relatively stable form across the sources, whereas mindfulness of the body contained only the observation of the impure constituents of the body, and mindfulness of dhammas originally referred only to the observation of the seven awakening factors. (Note: Kuan refers to Bronkhorst (1985), Dharma and Abhidharma, p.312-314.) Sujato's reconstruction similarly only retains the contemplation of the impure under mindfulness of the body, while including only the five hindrances and the seven awakening factors under mindfulness of dhammas. (Note: Kuan refers to Sujato (2006), A history of mindfulness: how insight worsted tranquility in the Satipatthana Sutta, p.264-273) According to Bhikkhu Anālayo, mindfulness of breathing was probably absent from the original scheme, noting that one can easily contemplate the body's decay taking an external object, that is, someone else's body, but not be externally mindfull of the breath, that is, someone else's breath.

	Sujato's reconstruction (2012)	Theravāda Vibhanga	Sarvāstivāda Dharma-skandha	Śāriputr-ābhidharma	Theravāda Mahā-satipatṭhāna Sutta	Sarvāstivāda Smṛtyupasthāna Sūtra	Ekāyana Sūtra	Long Prajñā-pāramitā Sūtra
Body (kaya)	Impure body parts	Parts of the body	Parts of the body, 6 elements	4 postures, Clear Comprehending, Ānāpānasati, Parts of the body, 4 elements, Food, Space (5th element), Oozing orifices, Death contemplation	Ānāpānasati, 4 postures, Clear Comprehending, Parts of the body, 4 elements, Death contemplation	4 postures, Clear Comprehending, Cutting off thought, Suppressing thought, Ānāpānasati, 4 jhāna similes, Perception of light, Basis of reviewing, Parts of the body, 6 elements, Death contemplation	Parts of the body, 4 elements, Oozing orifices, Death contemplation	4 Postures, Comprehension, Ānāpānasati, 4 elements, Body parts, Death contemplation
Feelings (vedana)	Pleasant/unpleasant/neutral, Carnal/spiritual	Happy/pain/neutral, Carnal/spiritual	Happy/pain/neutral, Bodily/Mental, Carnal/spiritual, Sensual/Non–sensual	Happy/pain/neutral, Carnal/spiritual	Happy/pain/neutral, Carnal/spiritual	Happy/pain/neutral, Bodily/Mental, Carnal/spiritual, Sensual/Non–sensual	Happy/pain/neutral, Carnal/spiritual, No mixed feelings	N/A (the source only mentions that one practices mindfulness of feelings without elaborating)
Mind (Cittā)	Greedy (or not), Angry, Deluded, Contracted, Exalted, Surpassed, Samādhi, Released	Greedy, Angry, Deluded, Contracted, Slothful, Small, Distracted, Quiet, Samādhi, Developed, Released	Greedy, Angry, Deluded, Contracted, Exalted, Surpassed, Samādhi, Released	Greedy, Angry, Deluded, Contracted, Exalted, Surpassed, Samādhi, Released	Greedy, Angry, Deluded, Defiled, Contracted, Small, Lower, Developed, Samādhi, Released	Greedy, Angry, Deluded, Affection, Attained, Confused, Contracted, Universal, Exalted, Surpassed, Samādhi, Released	N/A	
Dhammā	Hindrances, Factors of Enlightenment	Hindrances, Factors of Enlightenment	Hindrances, 6 Sense-Bases, Factors of Enlightenment	Hindrances, 6 Sense-Bases, Factors of Enlightenment, Four Noble Truths	Hindrances, Aggregates, 6 Sense-Bases, Factors of Enlightenment, Four Noble Truths	Hindrances, 6 Sense-Bases, Factors of Enlightenment	Hindrances, Factors of Enlightenment, 4 jhānas	N/A

== Interpretation and practice ==
=== Stage of practice leading to jhana ===
According to Rupert Gethin, "[t]he sutta is often read today as describing a pure form of insight (vipassanā) meditation that bypasses calm (samatha) meditation and the four absorptions (jhāna)." Yet, in the older Buddhist tradition, mindfulness aided in abandoning the five hindrances, which then leads into the first jhana. (Note: Gethin: "The sutta is often read today as describing a pure form of insight (vipassanā) meditation that bypasses calm (samatha) meditation and the four absorptions (jhāna), as outlined in the description of the Buddhist path found, for example, in the Sāmaññaphala-sutta [...] The earlier tradition, however, seems not to have always read it this way, associating accomplishment in the exercise of establishing mindfulness with abandoning of the five hindrances and the first absorption.) According to Gethin, the early Buddhist texts have "a broadly consistent vision" regarding meditation practice. Various practices lead to the development of the factors of awakening, which are not only the means to, but also the constituents of awakening.

Gethin, followed by Polak and Arbel, notes that there is a "definite affinity" between the bojjhaṅgā, the seven factors of awakening, and the four jhanas, which actualize the Buddhist practices aiming at calming the mind. According to Gethin, satipatthana and anapanasati are related to a formula that summarizes the Buddhist path to awakening as "abandoning the hindrances, establishing [...] mindfulness, and developing the seven factors of awakening." This results in a "heightened awareness," "overcoming distracting and disturbing emotions," which are not particular elements of the path to awakening, but rather common disturbing and distracting emotions.

According to Sujato, samatha and vipassana are complementary elements of the Buddhist path. Satipatthana explicates mindfulness, the seventh limb of the eightfold path, and is to be understood as an integral part of this path.

Polak, elaborating on Vetter, notes that the onset of the first dhyana is described as a quite natural process, due to the preceding efforts to restrain the senses and the nurturing of wholesome states. According to Grzegorz Polak, the four upassanā do not refer to four different foundations of which one should be aware, but are an alternate description of the jhanas, describing how the samskharas are tranquilized:

- the six sense-bases which one needs to be aware of (kāyānupassanā);
- contemplation on vedanās, which arise with the contact between the senses and their objects (vedanānupassanā);
- the altered states of mind to which this practice leads (cittānupassanā);
- the development from the five hindrances to the seven factors of enlightenment (dhammānupassanā).

=== Various practices ===
There are a variety of ways that one could use the methods described in the Satipaṭṭhāna Sutta including:

1. Focus on a single method. (Note: In support of a single-method practice, Analāyo (2006), p. 22, comments: Several [Pali Canon] discourses relate the practice of a single satipaṭṭhāna directly to realization. Similarly, the commentaries assign to each single satipaṭṭhāna meditation the capacity to lead to full awakening. This may well be why a high percentage of present-day meditation teachers focus on the use of a single meditation technique, on the ground that a single-minded and thorough perfection of one meditation technique can cover all aspects of satipaṭṭhāna, and thus be sufficient to gain realization. Among those teachers who Analāyo uses to exemplify this teaching method are S. N. Goenka and Ajahn Lee Dhammadharo. While justifying such a practice, Analāyo (2006), p. 23, nonetheless adds this caveat: Thus any single meditation practice from the satipaṭṭhāna scheme is capable of leading to deep insight.... Nonetheless, an attempt to cover all four satipaṭṭhānas in one's practice ... ensures speedy progress and a balanced and comprehensive development.) The method most written about in the English language is that of mindfulness of breath.
2. Practice the various methods individually in succession.
3. Maintain breath mindfulness as a primary object while using other methods to address non-breath stimuli. (Note: This is espoused in various ways – either implicitly or explicitly – by numerous teachers such as Gunaratana, 1996; Goldstein, 1987; and, Nhat Hanh, 2005. In such an approach, the central instructions relate to breath meditation but additional instructions are provided for dealing with mindfulness in daily life (Clear Comprehension) and unwholesome mental content such as the Hindrances or the fetters (which are referenced in the Satipaṭṭhāna Sutta in regard to sense-base mindfulness). Typical of such approaches, Thanissaro (2000) writes: At first glance, the four frames of reference for satipatthana practice sound like four different meditation exercises, but MN 118 makes clear that they can all center on a single practice: keeping the breath in mind. When the mind is with the breath, all four frames of reference are right there. The difference lies simply in the subtlety of one's focus. It's like learning to play the piano. As you get more proficient at playing, you also become sensitive in listening to ever more subtle levels in the music. This allows you to play even more skillfully. In the same way, as a meditator get more skilled in staying with the breath, the practice of satipatthana gives greater sensitivity in peeling away ever more subtle layers of participation in the present moment until nothing is left standing in the way of total release.)
4. Practice multiple methods either in tandem or in a context-driven manner. (Note: For instance, Analāyo (2006), pp. 21-23, has pointed out that the first three body-centered methods suggest different depths or a progression of practice based on one's activity. For example, one engaged in simply walking or standing (two of the so-called "postures") could be mindful of gross sensory stimulation; then when one is silent and planning to speak, one could first contemplate one's purpose in speaking (indicative of Clear Comprehension); in addition, while one is sitting still with a focus on one's in-breath and out-breath, one is able to pursue a deeper development of samatha and vipassana as part of formal breath meditation.)

		experiential orientation (character)
		affective (extrovert)	cognitive (introvert)
reactivity / temperament	slow	body	mind
reactivity / temperament	quick	sensations	mental contents

According to Bhikkhu Analāyo and Bhikkhu Soma, writing from a traditional point of view, the Papañcasudani recommends a different satipaṭṭhāna depending on whether a person:

- tends more toward affective craving or intellectual speculation; and,
- is more measured in their responses or quick reacting.

Based on these two dimensions the commentary's recommended personality-based satipaṭṭhāna is reflected in the grid shown at right.

Soma (2003, p. xxiv) adds that all practitioners (regardless of their character and temperament) should also practice mindfulness of Postures (moving, standing, sitting, lying down) and Clear Understanding, about which he writes: "The whole practice of mindfulness depends on the correct grasp of the exercises included in the two parts referred to here."

== English commentaries ==
- Anālayo (2004), Satipatthana: The Direct Path to Realization, Windhorse Publications, ISBN 978-1899579549
- Anālayo (2013), Perspectives on Satipaṭṭhāna, Windhorse Publications, ISBN 978-1909314030
- Anālayo (2018), Satipatthana Meditation: A Practice Guide, Windhorse Publications, ISBN 978-1911407102
- Goenka, S.N. (2015), Satipatthana Sutta Discourses, Pariyatti Publishing, ISBN 978-1938754906
- Goldstein, Joseph (2016), Mindfulness: A Practical Guide to Awakening, Sounds True, ISBN 978-1622036059
- Gunaratana, Bhante (2014), The Four Foundations of Mindfulness in Plain English, Wisdom Publications, ISBN 978-1614290384
- Nhất Hạnh, Thích (2002), Transformation and Healing: Sutra on the Four Establishments of Mindfulness, Parallax Press, ISBN 978-1888375626
- Nyanaponika (2014), The Heart of Buddhist Meditation, Weiser Books, ISBN 978-1578635580
- Sīlānanda, Sayadaw U (2003), The Four Foundations of Mindfulness, Wisdom Publications, ISBN 978-0861713288
- Soma Maha Thera, Kotahene (1998), The Way of Mindfulness: The Satipatthana Sutta and Its Commentary, Buddhist Publication Society, ISBN 978-9552402562

== See also ==
- Sutta Piṭaka
- Satipatthana (Four Foundations of Mindfulness)
- Mahasati Meditation
- Kāyagatāsati Sutta
- Related practices:
  - Anussati
  - Bhāvanā
  - Sampajanna
  - Patikulamanasikara

== Notes ==
Subnotes

== Sources ==
- Arbel, Keren (2017), Early Buddhist Meditation: The Four Jhanas as the Actualization of Insight, Routledge, doi:10.4324/9781315676043, ISBN 9781317383994
- Anālayo, Bhikkhu (2006), Satipatthāna: The Direct Path to Realization (PDF), Birmingham: Windhorse Publications, ISBN 1-899579-54-0
- Bronkhorst, Johannes (1985), "Dharma and Abhidharma", Bulletin of the School of Oriental and African Studies, 48 (2): 305–320
- Bullitt, John T. (2002). Beyond the Tipitaka: A Field Guide to Post-canonical Pali Literature. Available on-line at http://www.accesstoinsight.org/lib/authors/bullitt/fieldguide.html#atthakatha Archived 2009-05-09 at the Wayback Machine.
- Gethin, Rupert (1992), The Buddhist Path to Awakening, OneWorld Publications
- Gethin, Rupert (2004), "On the Practice of Buddhist Meditation According to the Pali Nikayas and Exegetical Sources", Buddhismus in Geschichte und Gegenwart, 9: 201–21
- Gethin, Rupert (2008), Sayings of the Buddha: New Translations from the Pali Nikayas, Oxford World's Classics
- Goldstein, Joseph (1987), The Experience of Insight, Boston, MA: Shambhala Publications, ISBN 0-87773-226-4
- Gombrich, Richard F. (1996), How Buddhism Began: The Conditioned Genesis of the Early Teachings, London: Athlone Press, ISBN 0-415-37123-6
- Gyori, Thomas I. (1996). The Foundations of Mindfulness (Satipatthāna) as a Microcosm of the Theravāda Buddhist World View (M.A. dissertation). Cited in Anālayo (2006). Washington: American University.
- Gunaratana, Henepola (1988), The Jhanas in Theravada Buddhist Meditation, Kandy, Sri Lanka: Buddhist Publication Society, ISBN 955-24-0035-X
- Hamilton, Sue (1996; reprinted 2001). Identity and Experience: The Constitution of the Human Being according to Early Buddhism. Oxford: Luzac Oriental. ISBN 1-898942-23-4.
- Kuan, Tse-fu (2008), Mindfulness in Early Buddhism: New Approaches through Psychology and Textual Analysis of Pāli, Chinese and Sanskrit Sources, Routledge, ISBN 978-0-415-43737-0
- Thera, Ñanamoli; Bodhi, Bhikkhu (1994), Maha-sihanada Sutta: The Great Discourse on the Lion's Roar (MN 12)
- Nhat Hanh, Thich (2005), Transformation and Healing : Sutra on the Four Establishments of Mindfulness, Berkeley, CA: Parallax Press, ISBN 0-938077-34-1
- Thera, Nyanaponika (1996), The Heart of Buddhist Meditation: A Handbook of Mental Training based on the Buddha's Way of Mindfulness, York Beach, ME: Samuel Weiser, ISBN 0-87728-073-8
- Nyanasatta Thera (trans.) (1994). The Foundations of Mindfulness (MN 10). Available on-line at http://www.accesstoinsight.org/tipitaka/mn/mn.010.nysa.html.
- Polak, Grzegorz (2011), Reexamining Jhana: Towards a Critical Reconstruction of Early Buddhist Soteriology, UMCS
- Rhys Davids, T.W. & William Stede (eds.) (1921–5). The Pali Text Society's Pali–English Dictionary. Chipstead: Pali Text Society. A general on-line search engine for the PED is available at http://dsal.uchicago.edu/dictionaries/pali/.
- Sharf, Robert (October 2014), "Mindfulness and Mindlessness in Early Chan" (PDF), Philosophy East and West, 64 (4): 933–964, doi:10.1353/pew.2014.0074, S2CID 144208166
- Sujato, Bhante (2012), A History of Mindfulness (PDF), Santipada, ISBN 9781921842092
- Thera, Soma (1999), The Discourse on the Arousing of Mindfulness (MN 10)
- Thera, Soma (2003), The Way of Mindfulness, Kandy, Sri Lanka: Buddhist Publication Society, ISBN 955-24-0256-5
- Thanissaro, Bhikkhu (1995), Satipatthana Sutta: The Frames of Reference (MN 10)
- Thanissaro, Bhikkhu (2000), Maha-satipatthana Sutta: The Great Frames of Reference (DN 22)
- Vetter, Tilmann (1988), The Ideas and Meditative Practices of Early Buddhism, BRILL
- Vipassana Research Institute (trans.) (1996). Mahāsatipaṭṭhāna Sutta: The Great Discourse on Establishing Mindfulness. Seattle, WA: Vipassana Research Publications of America. ISBN 0-9649484-0-0.
- Williams, Paul; Tribe, Anthony (2000), Buddhist Thought, Routledge
