= Satipatthana =

Mindfulness in Buddhism

Translations of Satipaṭṭhāna
- Sanskrit: स्मृत्युपस्थान (smṛtyupasthāna)
- Pali: satipaṭṭhāna
- Chinese: 念處
- Japanese: 念処 (nenjo)
- Khmer: សតិបដ្ឋាន (Satepadthan)
- Thai: สติปัฏฐาน

Satipatthana (Pali: Satipaṭṭhāna; Sanskrit: smṛtyupasthāna) is a central practice in the Buddha's teachings, meaning "the establishment of mindfulness" or "presence of mindfulness", or alternatively "foundations of mindfulness", aiding the development of a wholesome state of mind. In Theravada Buddhism, applying mindful attention to four domains, the body, feelings, the mind, and key principles or categories of the Buddha's teaching (dhammās), is thought to aid the elimination of the five hindrances and the development of the seven aspects of awakening.

The Satipatthana Sutta is probably the most influential meditation text in modern Theravada Buddhism, on which the teachings of the Vipassana movement are based. While these teachings are found in all Buddhist traditions, modern Theravada Buddhism and the Vipassana Movement are known especially for promoting the practice of satipaṭṭhāna as developing mindfulness to gain insight into impermanence, thereby reaching a first state of liberation. In the popular understanding, mindfulness has developed into a practice of bare awareness to calm the mind.

== Etymology ==
=== Satipaṭṭhāna ===
Satipaṭṭhāna is a compound term that has been parsed (and thus translated) in two ways, namely Sati-paṭṭhāna and Sati-upaṭṭhāna. The separate terms can be translated as follows:

- Sati – Pali; Sanskrit smṛti. Smṛti originally meant "to remember", "to recollect", "to bear in mind", as in the Vedic tradition of remembering the sacred text; the term sati also means "to remember". According to Sharf, in the Satipațțhāna-sutta the term sati means to remember the wholesome dhammās, whereby the true nature of phenomena can be seen, such as the five faculties, the five powers, the seven awakening-factors, the Noble Eightfold Path, and the attainment of insight. Usually, sati is interpreted as observing and watching various phenomena or domains of experience, being aware and attentive of them in the present moment.
- Upaṭṭhāna (Sanskrit: upasthāna) – "attendance, waiting on, looking after, service, care, ministering"
- Paṭṭhāna – "setting forth, putting forward"; in later Buddhist literature also "origin", "starting point", "cause".

The compound terms have been translated as follows:

- Sati-upaṭṭhāna – "presence of mindfulness" or "establishment of mindfulness" or "arousing of mindfulness", underscoring the mental qualities co-existent with or antecedent to mindfulness.
- Sati-paṭṭhāna – "foundation of mindfulness", underscoring the object used to gain mindfulness.

While the latter parsing and translation is more traditional, the former has been given etymological and contextual authority by contemporary Buddhist scholars such as Bhikkhu Analayo and Bhikkhu Bodhi. (Note: For the traditional use of the translation, "foundations [paṭṭhānā] of mindfulness," see, e.g., Gunaratana (2012) and U Silananda (2002). For appraisals supporting the parsing of the suffix as upaṭṭhāna, see, e.g., Anālayo (2006), pp. 29–30; and, Bodhi (2000), p. 1504.)

Anālayo argues from an etymological standpoint that, while "foundation [paṭṭhāna] of mindfulness" is supported by the Pāli commentary, the term paṭṭhāna (foundation) was otherwise unused in the Pāli nikayas and is only first used in the Abhidhamma. In contrast, the term upaṭṭhāna (presence or establishment) can in fact be found throughout the nikayas and is readily visible in the Sanskrit equivalents of the compound Pāli phrase satipaṭṭhāna (Skt., smṛtyupasthāna or smṛti-upasthāna). Thus Anālayo states that "presence of mindfulness" (as opposed to "foundation of mindfulness") is more likely to be etymologically correct.

Like Anālayo, Bodhi assesses that "establishment [upaṭṭhāna] of mindfulness" is the preferred translation. However, Bodhi's analysis is more contextual than Anālayo's. According to Bodhi, while "establishment of mindfulness" is normally supported by the textual context, there are exceptions to this rule, such as with SN 47.42 (Note: pp. 1660, 1928 n. 180) where a translation of "foundation of mindfulness" is best supported. Soma uses both "foundations of mindfulness" and "arousing of mindfulness."

=== Sati ===
The term sati (Sanskrit: smṛti), which is often translated as mindfulness, also means memory and recollection, and it is often used in that sense in the early discourses, which sometimes define sati as "the ability of calling to mind what has been done or said long ago." According to Sharf, in the Satipaṭṭhāna Sutta, the term sati means to remember the dharmas, which allows one to see the true nature of phenomena.

According to Anālayo, sati does not literally mean memory, but "that which facilitates and enables memory." This is particularly applicable in the context of satipaṭṭhāna, in which sati does not refer to remembering past events, but an "awareness of the present moment", and to remember to stay in that awareness (especially if one's attention wanders away). Anālayo states that it is this clear and awake state of presence that allows one to easily remember whatever is experienced. He also states that sati is a detached, uninvolved and non-reactive observation which does not interfere with what it is observing (such an active function is instead associated with right effort, not mindfulness). This allows one to clearly attend to things in a more sober, objective and impartial manner. Regarding upaṭṭhāna, Anālayo writes that it means "being present" and "attending" in this context. He further states: "Understood in this way, "satipaṭṭhāna" means that sati "stands by", in the sense of being present; sati is "ready at hand", in the sense of attending to the current situation. Satipaṭṭhāna can then be translated as "presence of mindfulness" or as "attending with mindfulness."

Paul Williams (referring to Frauwallner) states that satipaṭṭhāna practice refers to "constantly watching sensory experience in order to prevent the arising of cravings which would power future experience into rebirths." (Note: Frauwallner, E. (1973), History of Indian Philosophy, trans. V.M. Bedekar, Delhi: Motilal Banarsidass. Two volumes., pp.150 ff)

Rupert Gethin, who argues that satipaṭṭhāna is derived from sati+upaṭṭhāna, sees satipaṭṭhāna as "the activity of observing or watching the body, feelings, mind and dhammas," as well as "a quality of mind that 'stands near'" (the literal meaning of upaṭṭhāna) or "serves' the mind," and even "presence of mind". Gethin further notes that sati ('mindfulness') refers to "remembering" or "having in mind" something. It is keeping something in mind without wavering or losing it.

Bhikkhu Bodhi writes that sati is "a presence of mind, attentiveness or awareness" as well as "bare attention, a detached observation of what is happening within us and around us in the present moment [...] the mind is trained to remain in the present, open, quiet, alert, contemplating the present event." He also states that sati is "what brings the field of experience into focus and makes it accessible to insight." According to Bodhi, to be mindful, "all judgements and interpretations have to be suspended, or if they occur, just registered and dropped."

Bhante Gunaratana explains satipaṭṭhāna practice as bringing full awareness to our present moment bodily and mental activities.

According to Sujato, mindfulness is "the quality of mind which recollects and focuses awareness within an appropriate frame of reference, bearing in mind the what, why, and how of the task at hand."

== Textual accounts ==
=== Early Buddhist texts ===
In the Pāli Tipitaka, the four satipaṭṭhānas are found throughout the Satipaṭṭhāna-samyutta (SN, Chapter 47) which contains 104 of the Buddha's discourses on the satipaṭṭhānas. Other saṁyuttas in SN also deal with satipaṭṭhāna extensively, such as the Anuruddha-saṁyutta. They can also be found in the Satipaṭṭhāna Sutta (MN 10), as well as in DN 22 which is mostly the same with the addition of the four noble truths.

The Mūlasarvāstivāda Saṃyukta Āgama (SĀ, Taisho Tripitaka #99) contains an entire section devoted to smṛtyupasthāna, which parallels the Pali Satipaṭṭhāna-samyutta. According to Sujato, the Sarvāstivāda Smṛtyupasthāna Sūtra seems to emphasize samatha or calm abiding, while the Theravadin version emphasizes vipassana or insight.

The Chinese Tripitaka also contains two parallels to the Satipaṭṭhāna sutta; Madhyama Āgama (MĀ) No. 98 (belonging to the Sarvāstivāda) and the Ekottara Āgama 12.1, Ekāyana Sūtra (possibly from the Mahāsaṅghika school). Their presentation of the satipaṭṭhāna formula has some significant differences with the Theravada version. For example, MĀ 98 lists the four jhanas and the 'perception of light' under mindfulness of the body as well as listing six elements instead of four. However they generally share the same structure and several basic practices.

=== Scholastic and Abhidhamma texts ===
The four satipaṭṭhāna are analyzed and systematized in the scholastic and Abhidharma works of the various Buddhist schools. In these later texts, various doctrinal developments can be seen. The satipaṭṭhānas can be found in the Vibhaṅga (a book of the Theravada Abhidhamma Pitaka) in a form which differs from that in the Satipaṭṭhāna Sutta. According to Johannes Bronkhorst and Bhikkhu Sujato, the satipaṭṭhāna formulation in the Vibhaṅga is actually an earlier version of the formula (it includes fewer elements than the Satipaṭṭhāna Sutta). The Sarvāstivāda Abhidharma text called the Dharmaskandha also contains a passage with the smṛtyupasthāna schema. According to Sujato, this is very similar to the passage from the Vibhaṅga. The Śāriputrābhidharma, an Abhidharma text of the Dharmaguptaka school, also contains a passage with the smṛtyupasthānas.

In his history of satipaṭṭhāna, Bhikkhu Sujato writes that:

In the early teachings satipaṭṭhāna was primarily associated not with vipassanā but with samatha. Since for the Suttas, samatha and vipassanā cannot be divided, a few passages show how this samatha practice evolves into vipassanā. In later literature the vipassanā element grew to predominate, almost entirely usurping the place of samatha in satipaṭṭhāna.

Tse-fu Kuan agrees, noting that "the tendency to dissociate satipaṭṭhāna from samatha is apparently a rather late development." According to Sujato, various canonical texts which show sectarian Theravada elements consistently depict satipaṭṭhāna as more closely aligned with vipassanā practice. However, in the canonical Abhidhamma, satipaṭṭhāna is still said to be associated with jhana as well. For example, according to Kuan, the Vibhanga "says that when a monk attains the first jhāna and contemplates the body (feelings, etc.) as a body (feelings, etc.), at that time sati, anussati, etc. are called 'satipaṭṭhāna.'" Meanwhile, the canonical Abhidharma texts of the Sarvāstivāda tradition consistently interpreted the smṛtyupasthānas as being a practice that was associated with samadhi and dhyana. This can be seen in the Mahāvibhāṣa Śāstra, which contains a section on how to practice the smṛtyupasthānas in the context of the four dhyanas and the formless attainments.

In the later texts of the Theravada tradition, like the Visuddhimagga, the focus on vipassanā is taken even further. Some of these works claim that one may reach awakening by practicing dry insight meditation (vipassanā without jhana) based on satipaṭṭhāna. Through this practice, one is said to be able to reach a "transcendental jhana" which lasts for one mind moment prior to realization. According to Sujato this is a "grave distortion of the suttas".

The same kind of trend can be seen in some later, post-canonical Sarvāstivāda Abhidharma works, such as the Abhidharmasāra of Dharmaśrī. This text, unlike the canonical Sarvāstivāda Abhidharma, treats the four smṛtyupasthānas as mainly vipassanā practices. This presentation influenced later works like the Abhidharmakośa (4th century CE), which "defines satipaṭṭhāna not as ‘mindfulness’, but as ‘understanding’ (paññā)." However, this practice is only undertaken after having practiced samādhi based on ānāpānasati or contemplation of the body and so is not equivalent to the dry insight approach of the later Theravada.

=== Mahayana texts ===
Mahayana Buddhist texts also contain teachings on the four smṛtyupasthānas. These include the Pratyutpanna Samādhi Sūtra, Asanga's Abhidharmasamuccaya, the Yogācārabhūmi, Vasubandhu's Madhyāntavibhāgabhāṣya, the Avataṁsaka Sūtra, and Santideva's Śikṣāsamuccaya. Furthermore, Nagarjuna's Letter to a Friend contains a passage which affirms the early Buddhist understanding of the four smṛtyupasthānas as closely connected with samādhi: "he persevering practice (of smṛtyupasthāna) is called ‘samādhi’." Another parallel passage of the satipaṭṭhāna schema can be found in the Pañcavimsatisāhasrikā Prajñāpāramitā sutra. Another passage is found in the Śrāvakabhūmi.

=== Elements in the early texts ===
The various early sources for satipaṭṭhāna provide an array of practices for each domain of mindfulness. Some of these sources are more elaborate and contain more practices than others. The table below contains the main elements found in the various early Buddhist sources on the satipaṭṭhānas.

Various scholars have attempted to use the numerous early sources to trace an "ur-text" i.e. the original satipaṭṭhāna formula or the earliest sutta. Bronkhorst (1985) argues that, in the earliest form of the Satipaṭṭhāna Sutta, mindfulness of feelings and mindfulness of mind were transmitted in a relatively stable form across the sources, whereas mindfulness of the body contained only the observation of the impure constituents of the body, and mindfulness of dhammas originally referred only to the observation of the seven awakening factors. (Note: Kuan refers to Bronkhorst (1985), Dharma and Abhidharma, p.312-314.) Sujato's reconstruction similarly only retains the contemplation of the impure under mindfulness of the body, while including only the five hindrances and the seven awakening factors under mindfulness of dhammas. (Note: Kuan refers to Sujato (2006), A history of mindfulness: how insight worsted tranquility in the Satipatthana Sutta, p.264-273)

According to Anālayo, mindfulness of breathing was probably absent from the original scheme and appears to have been incorporated later from the sixteen-step scheme of ānāpānasati. He notes that one can easily contemplate the body's decay by taking an external object, that is, someone else's body, but not be externally mindful of the breath, that is, someone else's breath.

	Sujato's reconstruction (2012)	Theravāda Vibhanga	Sarvāstivāda Dharma-skandha	Śāriputr-ābhidharma	Theravāda Mahā-satipatṭhāna Sutta	Sarvāstivāda Smṛtyupasthāna Sūtra	Ekāyana Sūtra	Long Prajñā-pāramitā Sūtra
Body (kaya)	Impure body parts	Parts of the body	Parts of the body, 6 elements	4 postures, Clear Comprehending, Ānāpānasati, Parts of the body |4 elements, Food, Space (5th element), Oozing orifices, Death contemplation	Ānāpānasati, 4 postures, Clear Comprehending, Parts of the body, 4 elements, Death contemplation	4 postures, Clear Comprehending, Cutting off thought, Suppressing thought, Ānāpānasati, 4 jhāna similes, Perception of light, Basis of reviewing, Parts of the body, 6 elements, Death contemplation	Parts of the body, 4 elements, Oozing orifices, Death contemplation	4 Postures, Comprehension, Ānāpānasati, 4 elements, Body parts, Death contemplation
Feelings (vedana)	Pleasant/unpleasant/neutral, Carnal/spiritual	Happy/pain/neutral, Carnal/spiritual	Happy/pain/neutral, Bodily/Mental, Carnal/spiritual, Sensual/Non–sensual	Happy/pain/neutral, Carnal/spiritual	Happy/pain/neutral, Carnal/spiritual	Happy/pain/neutral, Bodily/Mental, Carnal/spiritual, Sensual/Non–sensual	Happy/pain/neutral, Carnal/spiritual, No mixed feelings	N/A (the source only mentions that one practices mindfulness of feelings without elaborating)
Mind (Cittā)	Lustful (or not), Angry, Deluded, Contracted, Exalted, Surpassed, Samādhi, Released	Greedy (or not), Angry, Deluded, Contracted, Exalted, Surpassed, Samādhi, Released	Greedy, Angry, Deluded, Contracted, Slothful, Small, Distracted, Quiet, Samādhi, Developed, Released	Greedy, Angry, Deluded, Contracted, Exalted, Surpassed, Samādhi, Released	Greedy, Angry, Deluded, Contracted, Exalted, Surpassed, Samādhi, Released	Greedy, Angry, Deluded, Defiled, Contracted, Small, Lower, Developed, Samādhi, Released	Greedy, Angry, Deluded, Affection, Attained, Confused, Contracted, Universal, Exalted, Surpassed, Samādhi, Released	N/A
Dhammā	Hindrances, Factors of Enlightenment	Hindrances, Factors of Enlightenment	Hindrances, 6 Sense-Bases, Factors of Enlightenment	Hindrances, 6 Sense-Bases, Factors of Enlightenment, Four Noble Truths	Hindrances, Aggregates, 6 Sense-Bases, Factors of Enlightenment, Four Noble Truths	Hindrances, 6 Sense-Bases, Factors of Enlightenment	Hindrances, Factors of Enlightenment, 4 jhānas	N/A

== Connection with other Buddhist teachings ==
=== Gradual training ===
The satipaṭṭhānas are one of the seven sets of "states conducive to awakening" (Pāli bodhipakkhiyādhammā) identified in many schools of Buddhism as means for progressing toward bodhi (awakening). The early sources also contain passages in which the Buddha is said to refer to satipaṭṭhāna as a path which is "ekā-yano" for purification and the realisation of nirvana. The term ekāyano has been interpreted and translated in different ways including "the only path" (Soma), "direct path," (Analayo, B. Bodhi), "path to convergence" i.e. to samādhi (Sujato) and the "comprehensive" or "all-inclusive" path where all practices converge (Kuan). (Note: See the Satipatthana sutta (MN 10; DN 22); as well as SN 47.1, 47.18 and 47.43. These five discourses are the only canonical sources for the phrase, "ekāyano ... maggo" (with this specific declension). The Pāli phrase "ekāyano ... maggo" has been translated as: "direct path" (Bodhi & Gunaratana, 2012, p. 12; Nanamoli & Bodhi, 1995; Thanissaro, 2008); "one-way path"(Bodhi, 2000, pp. 1627–8, 1647–8, 1661); "the only way" (Nyanasatta, 2004; Soma, 1941/2003); "the one and only way" (Vipassana Research Institute, 1996, pp. 2, 3)) (Note: "Bhikkhus, this is the one-way path for the purification of beings, for the overcoming of sorrow and lamentation, for the passing away of pain and displeasure, for the achievement of the method, (Note: Bodhi (2000, SN 47 n. 123, Kindle Loc. 35147) notes: "Spk [the commentary to the Samyutta Nikaya] explains the 'method' (ñāya) as the Noble Eightfold Path....") for the realization of Nibbāna, that is, the four establishments of mindfulness. (Note: SN 47.1 (Bodhi, 2000, p. 1627). Also see DN 22, MN 10, SN 47.18 and SN 47.43.) The wholesome establishments of mindfulness are contrasted with the unwholesome qualities of the five strands of sensuality, namely pleasant sensations from the eye, the ear, the tongue and the body.) According to Sujato, in the context of the graduated path to awakening found in numerous early texts, the practice of the satipaṭṭhānas is closely connected with various elements, including sense restraint, moderate eating, wakefulness, clear comprehension, seclusion, establishing mindfulness and abandoning the hindrances.

The place of satipaṭṭhāna in the gradual training is thus outlined by Sujato as follows:

One's understanding of the Dhamma impels one to renounce in search of peace; one undertakes the rules of conduct and livelihood; applies oneself to restraint and mindfulness in all activities and postures; resorts to a secluded dwelling; establishes mindfulness in satipaṭṭhāna meditation; and develops the four jhānas leading to liberating insight.

Johannes Bronkhorst has argued that in the early texts there are two kinds of mindfulness, the preliminary stage of "mindfulness in daily life" (often called clear comprehension) and the practice of mindfulness meditation proper (the actual practice of satipaṭṭhāna as a formal meditation). According to Sujato, these two forms of mindfulness are so closely connected that they gradually came to be subsumed under the heading of satipaṭṭhāna.

=== Jhana ===
In the schema of the Noble Eightfold Path, they are included in sammā-sati (right mindfulness), which culminates in the final factor of the path, sammā-samādhi (a state of luminous awareness, but also interpreted as deep meditative absorption). This is confirmed by texts like MN 44.12 which state "the four satipaṭṭhānas are the basis for samādhi." The close connection between satipaṭṭhāna and samādhi can also be seen in texts which discuss the three trainings (such as MN 44.11/MA 210) which list satipaṭṭhāna under samādhi. Thus, according to Bhikkhu Sujato, "all of the basic statements on the function of satipaṭṭhāna in the path confirm that its prime role is to support samādhi, that is, jhāna." Rupert Gethin also affirms the close connection between satipaṭṭhāna and the jhanas, citing various discourses from the Pali Nikayas (such as SN 47.10 and SN 47.8).

In the oldest texts of Buddhism, dhyāna (Sanskrit) or jhāna (Pāḷi) is the training of the mind, commonly translated as meditation, to withdraw the mind from the automatic responses to sense-impressions, and leading to a "state of perfect equanimity and awareness (upekkhā-sati-parisuddhi)." Dhyāna may have been the core practice of pre-sectarian Buddhism, in combination with several related practices which together lead to perfected mindfulness and detachment, and are fully realized with the practice of dhyana. In the later commentarial tradition, which has survived in present-day Theravāda, dhyāna is equated with "concentration," a state of one-pointed absorption in which there is a diminished awareness of the surroundings. Since the 1980s, scholars and practitioners have started to question this equation, arguing for a more comprehensive and integrated understanding and approach, based on the oldest descriptions of dhyāna in the suttas.

According to Anālayo, writing from a more traditional perspective, "several discourses testify to the important role of satipaṭṭhāna as a basis for the development of absorption" (jhana). This includes suttas like the Dantabhūmi Sutta and the Cūḷavedalla Sutta (which speaks of satipaṭṭhāna as the “cause” of samādhi, samādhinimitta). Anālayo also writes that satipaṭṭhāna is not purely a concentration (samādhi) exercise, noting that sati "represents an enhancement of the recollective function," in which the breadth of attention is expanded. During absorption, "sati becomes mainly presence of the mind," but in a more focused way. (Note: Anālayo (2006, p. 63): "...to consider satipaṭṭhāna purely as a concentration exercise goes too far and misses the important difference between what can become a basis for the development of concentration and what belongs to the realm of calmness meditation proper. While concentration corresponds to an enhancement of the selective function of the mind, by way of restricting the breadth of attention, sati on its own represents an enhancement of the recollective function, by way of expanding the breadth of attention. These two modes of mental functioning correspond to two different cortical control mechanisms in the brain. This difference, however, does not imply that the two are incompatible, since during absorption attainment both are present. But during absorption sati becomes mainly presence of the mind, when it to some extent loses its natural breadth owing to the strong focusing power of concentration.")

Anālayo cites SN 47.10 in which the Buddha states that if one is distracted and sluggish while practicing satipaṭṭhāna, one should switch one's meditation towards a calm (samatha) meditation, in order to cultivate joy and serenity. Once the mind has been calmed, one can then return to satipaṭṭhāna. Anālayo argues that the distinction that is made in this sutta between “directed” and “undirected” forms of meditation suggest that satipaṭṭhāna is not the same as samatha meditation. However, the sutta also shows that they are closely interrelated and mutually supporting.

Thanissaro Bhikkhu, citing various early sources (SN 47:40, MN 118, AN 4:94, AN 4:170, Dhp 372 etc.), similarly states that "developing the frames of reference [satipaṭṭhāna] is a precondition for jhana" and that "the proper development of the frames of reference necessarily incorporates, in and of itself, the practice of jhana."

== As four domains of mindfulness ==
=== The four domains ===
In the early Buddhist texts, mindfulness is explained as being established in four main ways:

1. mindfulness of the body (Pāli: kāyagatā-sati; Skt. kāya-smṛti),
2. mindfulness of feelings (Pāli vedanā-sati; Skt. vedanā-smṛti),
3. mindfulness of the mind (Pāli citta-sati; Skt. citta-smṛti)
4. mindfulness of principles or phenomena (Pāli dhammā-sati; Skt. dharma-smṛti).

Rupert Gethin translates (from the Pali) the basic exposition of these four practices (which he calls the "basic formula") that is shared by numerous early Buddhist sources as follows:

Here, bhikkhus, a bhikkhu [i] with regard to the body dwells watching body; he is ardent, he comprehends clearly, is possessed of mindfulness and overcomes both desire for and discontent with the world. [ii] With regard to feelings he dwells watching feeling [vedana] ... [iii] With regard to the mind he dwells watching mind [citta] ... [iv] With regard to dhammas he dwells watching dhamma; he is ardent, he comprehends clearly, is possessed of mindfulness and overcomes both desire for and discontent with the world.

According to Grzegorz Polak, the four upassanā have been misunderstood by the developing Buddhist tradition, including Theravada, to refer to four different foundations. According to Polak, the four upassanā do not refer to four different foundations of which one should be aware, but are an alternate description of the jhanas, describing how the samskharas are tranquilized:

- the six sense-bases which one needs to be aware of (kāyānupassanā);
- contemplation on vedanās, which arise with the contact between the senses and their objects (vedanānupassanā);
- the altered states of mind to which this practice leads (cittānupassanā);
- the development from the five hindrances to the seven factors of enlightenment (dhammānupassanā).

=== Mindfulness of the body ===
The various early sources show considerable variation in the practices included under mindfulness of the body. The most widely shared set of meditations are the contemplation of the body's anatomical parts, the contemplation of the elements, and the contemplation of a corpse in decay. Anālayo notes that the parallel versions of the Satipaṭṭhāna Sutta "agree not only in listing these three exercises, but also in the sequence in which they are presented." According to Sujato's comparative study of satipaṭṭhāna, the original mindfulness of the body practice focused on contemplating various parts of the body, while the other practices later came to be added under mindfulness of the body.

==== Body parts ====
The practice of mindfulness of anatomical parts is described in the Satipaṭṭhāna Sutta as follows: "one examines this same body up from the soles of the feet and down from the top of the hair, enclosed by skin and full of many kinds of impurity." Following this instruction is a list of various body parts, including hair, skin, teeth, numerous organs as well as different kinds of bodily liquids. According to Anālayo, this meditation, which is often called the meditation on "asubha" (the unattractive), is supposed to deconstruct notions of bodily beauty and to allow us to see that bodies are "not worth being attached to" (as the Ekottarika-āgama version states). Ultimately, according to Anālayo, "the principal aim of contemplating the anatomical constitution of the body is the removal of sensual desire." Sujato similarly states that the basic purpose of these three meditations "is to rise above sensuality," and to deprive "the addiction to sensual gratification" of its fuel.

According to U Sīlānanda, first one should memorize the 32 parts of the body by reciting them, then one learns the color, shape and location of each part. After achieving mastery in this, one is ready to contemplate the unattractiveness of each part in meditation. Bhikkhu Bodhi notes that this practice is done "using visualization as an aid." This practice is described with a common simile in the early discourses: one is mindful of each body part in the same way one is mindful when looking through various kinds of beans (or grains) in a bag (i.e. in a detached way). This indicates that the goal is not to become disgusted with the body but to see it in a detached manner. Bhante Gunaratana similarly notes that this practice "opens the mind to accepting our body as it is right now, without our usual emotional reactions. It helps us overcome pride and self-hatred and regard our body with the balanced mind of equanimity." Similarly, Thanissaro Bhikkhu argues that this practice, far from creating a negative self-image, allows us to develop a healthy understanding of the reality that all bodies are equal (and thus none is superior or inferior in terms of beauty, since such a concept is ultimately relative to one's frame of reference).

==== Elements ====
The practice of mindfulness of the elements or properties mainly focuses on four physical attributes (mahābhūta): earth (solids), water (liquids), air (gases moving in and outside the body, as well as breathing) and fire (warmth/temperature). The early texts compare this to how a butcher views and cuts up a slaughtered cow into various parts. According to Anālayo this second exercise focuses on diminishing the sense of identification with the body and thus, on seeing anatta (not-self) and undoing the sense of ownership to the body. Buddhaghosa states that through this practice a monk "immerses himself in voidness and eliminates the perception of living beings." The practice of contemplating these four properties is also described in more detail in the Mahāhaṭṭthipadopama Sutta, the Rāhulovāda Sutta, and the Dhātuvibhaṅga Sutta.

==== Corpse ====
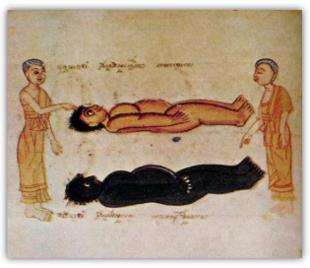
Illustration of mindfulness of death using corpses in a charnel ground, a part of the first satipatthana. From an early-20th-century manuscript found in Chaiya District, Surat Thani Province, Thailand.

The practice of mindfulness of death is explained as contemplating a corpse's various progressive stages of decay (from a fresh corpse to bone dust). According to Anālayo, the sources indicate that the practice could have been done in a charnel ground with real corpses but also indicate that one may visualize this as well. Bodhi writes that this practice can be done in the imagination, through using pictures or by viewing an actual formerly living human corpse.

The various early sources all indicate that one should contemplate how one's own body is of the same nature as the corpse. The Ekottarika-āgama version states that one is to contemplate how "my body will not escape from this calamity", "I will not escape from this condition. My body will also be destroyed," and "this body is impermanent, of a nature to fall apart." This practice allows one to gain insight into our own impermanence, and therefore also leads to letting go. In numerous early sources, contemplating the inevitability of death is also said to lead to increased motivation to practice the path.

==== Overall direction ====
Anālayo sums up the overall direction of mindfulness of the body as "detachment from the body through understanding its true nature." The early discourses compare mindfulness of the body to a strong pillar which can be used to tie up numerous wild animals (which are compared to the six senses). This simile shows that mindfulness of the body was seen as a powerful centering practice and as a strong anchor for maintaining the guarding of the senses. The Kāyagatāsati-sutta and its Madhyama-āgama parallel also list various others benefits from practicing mindfulness of the body, including how it helps to give rise to mental balance and detachment and allows one to endure many physical discomforts.

=== Mindfulness of feelings ===
This satipaṭṭhāna focuses on the contemplation of "feelings" (vedanā, affect, valence or hedonic tones), which mainly refers to how one perceives feelings as pleasant, unpleasant or neutral. According to Anālayo, mindfulness of feelings "requires recognizing the affective tone of present-moment experience, before the arisen feeling leads to mental reactions and elaborations." It also requires that "one does not get carried away by the individual content of felt experience and instead directs awareness to the general character of experience." The early discourses contain similes which compare feelings to various types of "fierce winds that can suddenly arise in the sky" as well as to "various types of people who stay in a guest house." These similes illustrate the need to remain calm and non-reactive in respect to feelings.

In most early sources, feelings are also distinguished between those which are sensual or worldly (lit. 'carnal') and those that are not sensual or spiritual in nature. This introduces an ethical distinction between feelings that can lead to the arising of defilements and those that lead in the opposite direction." Thus, while pleasant feelings associated with sense pleasures lead to unwholesome tendencies, pleasant feelings associated with mental concentration lead towards wholesome states. Meanwhile, a worldly painful feeling might lead to the arising of unwholesome mental states, but it need not do so if one is mindfully aware of it without reacting. Furthermore, certain painful feelings, like those caused by the sadness of knowing one has not yet reached liberation, are considered spiritual unpleasant feelings and can motivate one to practice more. As such, they are commendable.

The Madhyama-āgama version of the Satipaṭṭhāna Sutta also adds the additional categories of bodily and mental feelings, which refers to feelings that arise either from physical contact or from the mind (a distinction which does appear in other early discourses like the Salla-sutta SN 36.6 and its parallels). Furthermore, according to Sujato, the Ānāpānasati Sutta section on vedanā also adds "rapture" and "mental activities" (cittasankhāra, feeling and perception), which "seems to broaden the scope of feelings here as far as ‘emotions’, ‘moods’." Gunaratana similarly states that vedanā "includes both physical sensations and mental emotions."

Furthermore, Anālayo argues that "the central role that feelings have in this respect is particularly evident in the context of the dependent arising (paṭiccasamuppāda) of dukkha, where feeling forms the crucial link that can trigger the arising of craving." The fact that dependent origination can be contemplated through mindfulness of feelings is supported by SĀ 290. The early discourses also state that practicing mindfulness of feeling can be a way of dealing with physical pain and disease.

Bhikkhu Bodhi notes that feelings arise due to sense contact (phassa) and thus another way of analyzing feeling is into six types depending on the six sense bases: eye, nose, tongue, ear, body, and mind.

=== Mindfulness of the mind ===
In all early sources, the contemplation of the mind or cognition (citta) begins with noticing the presence or absence of the three unwholesome roots (lust, anger, and delusion). This practice is similar to that found in other early discourses in which the Buddha looks into his mind by applying a basic distinction between wholesome and unwholesome thoughts (and reflecting how unwholesome thoughts are harmful, which allows him to abandon them). This can be seen in the Dvedhāvitakka-sutta and its parallels such as MĀ 102. Other suttas like the Vitakkasaṇṭhāna-sutta and its parallels, provide several ways of dealing with unwholesome thoughts, such as replacing an unwholesome thought with a wholesome one or contemplating the drawbacks of unwholesome thoughts.

Reflecting on the absence of unwholesome states is also important, as it allows one to rejoice in this positive state and become inspired by it. It also encourages one to protect this mental state, as can be seen in the simile of the bronze dish found in the Anaṅgaṇa-sutta (MN 5) and its parallels such as EĀ 25.6. In this simile, a person who buys a bronze dish but takes no care to clean it from time to time is compared to someone who is unaware of having a mind free of unwholesome states. In this case, the dish (mind) will eventually get dirty. In the other hand, someone who has reached some degree of purity and is mindful of this is more likely to protect and maintain this mental state.

Anālayo writes that this way of contemplating the mind is a middle path that avoids two extremes:

one extreme is seeing only what is bad within oneself and consequently getting frustrated, succumbing to feelings of inadequacy. As a result of this, inspiration can get lost and one no longer engages fully in the practice. The other extreme is pretending to oneself (and in front of others) that one is better than one really is, at the cost of ignoring one's own dark sides, those areas of the mind that are in need of purification. Such ignoring allows those dark sides to gather strength until they are able to overwhelm the mind completely. Steering a balanced middle path between these two extremes becomes possible through the simple but effective element of honest recognition, introduced through mindfulness of the present condition of one's mind, which sees both one's shortcomings and one's virtues equally well.

This mindfulness is also extended into being aware of the level of mindfulness (or distraction) and concentration present in the mind (from contraction or a lesser mind to higher states such as samadhi and liberation). Anālayo states that the basic task here is "recognizing the degree to which one's practice has developed and realizing if more can be done."

Therefore, the terms such as a "small", "lower", "contracted" or "distracted" mind indicate a mind which lacks development in the qualities of mindfulness and samadhi. Other terms such as the "developed," "exalted" and "liberated" mind are referring to a mind that has achieved some level of samadhi and mindfulness (and in some cases, has been at least temporarily liberated from the hindrances through meditation). Sujato states that the terms associated with higher states of mind refer to the jhanas (he cites MN 54.22–24, MN 53.20–22 as support). Anālayo further notes that this element of contemplation of the mind shows that in early Buddhism "enquiring if one has reached some degree of attainment is considered an integral part of knowing the nature of one's own mental condition."

In the early discourses (SĀ 1246 and AN 3.100), the gradual process of removing unwholesome thoughts and cultivating wholesome mental states is compared to the gradual refining of gold ore which is initially covered over with rock, sand and fine dust (which represent the various gross and subtle aspects of mental defilement).

=== Mindfulness of dhammas ===
==== Five hindrances and seven aspects of wakefulness ====
This last set of exercises show considerable variation in the various early Buddhist sources. Only two sets of dhammas ("principles" or "mental categories") are shared by all early sources: the five hindrances and the seven factors of awakening, and Anālayo considers these two as integral elements of the fourth satipaṭṭhāna. Sujato's comparative study concludes that these two groups of dhammas constituted the original subjects of meditation in this satipaṭṭhāna, while the other elements are later additions. Thanissaro Bhikkhu states that it is not possible to decide the question of what the original version may have been, but he concludes that there is a good case for stating that "the early tradition regarded the abandoning of the hindrances and the development of the factors for Awakening as encompassing all the factors that might be included under this heading."

==== Dhamma ====
"Dhammā" is often translated as "mental objects" but Anālayo argues that this translation is problematic for multiple reasons. The three prior satipatthāna (body, sensations, mind) can become mental objects in themselves, and those objects, such as the hindrances, aggregates and sense bases, identified under the term dhamma are far from an exhaustive list of all possible mental objects. Anālayo translates dhammā as "mental factors and categories," "classificatory schemes," and "frameworks or points of reference to be applied during contemplation". Thanissaro Bhikkhu argues that the fourth satipaṭṭhāna "denotes the qualities of mind that are developed and abandoned as one masters the meditation."

Sujato argues that dhammā here refers to a "distinctive and more profound aspect of meditation: the understanding of the causal principles underlying the development of samādhi." According to Anālayo, this satipaṭṭhāna focuses on phenomena which lead to awakening when cultivated and therefore, it is soteriologically oriented. Anālayo states that the "main thrust" of the fourth satipaṭṭhāna is the path to awakening and therefore, "contemplation of dharmas is somewhat like a shorthand description of the path." He further adds that "the task of mindfulness in the context of contemplation of dharmas would thus be to supervise the mind on the path to awakening, ensuring that the hindrances are overcome and the awakening factors are well established."

==== Five hindrances ====
According to U Sīlānanda, a proponent of the New Burmese method, the five hindrances are those mental states that hinder or block the mind's progress to deeper concentration and liberation. In the early discourses (see MN 43.20, MN 68.6), the attainment of jhana is associated with the abandonment of the five hindrances, which are said to "choke the mind, robbing understanding of its strength". Through the simile of refining gold, the early discourses state that as long as the hindrances have not been removed "the mind is not soft, nor workable, nor radiant, but is brittle" (AN 5.13).

The Satipaṭṭhāna sutta indicates that one is to be mindful of the presence or absence of each of the five hindrances (sense desire, ill will, sloth-and-torpor, restlessness-and-worry and doubt). The sutta and the MA parallel also state that one should know how a hindrance arises, how it can be removed and how it can be prevented from arising. The fact that mindfulness of the hindrances is also connected to remembering the instructions on how to remove and prevent the hindrances (not just watch it mindfully) is supported by other early discourses like the Gopakamoggallāna-sutta and its parallels (like MĀ 145). Anālayo thus sees this practice as twofold: the receptive mode of just being aware of the hindrances and the more active mode of understanding how the hindrance arises and how it can be abandoned through a skillful deployment of right effort.

According to U Sīlānanda, various hindrances can arise from inappropriate attention/reflection (ayoniso manasikāra) and that proper or wise attention (yoniso manasikāra) can prevent their arising. Another way to prevent their arising is simply to be mindful of the hindrances. Various early discourses like SĀ 715 provide specific instructions on how to weaken and counter the hindrances. Desire is said to be countered with the contemplation of unattractiveness, ill will is countered with loving-kindness, sloth-torpor is countered with energetic thoughts or perceiving light (or being in a well lit place), restlessness-worry is countered with thoughts that bring calmness and doubt can be countered by contemplating dependent origination or contemplating what is wholesome and what is unwholesome. Suttas like the Saṅgārava-sutta mention that one benefit of removing the hindrances is an increased ability to learn and to remember what one has learned. The suttas also state that being mindful of the absence of the hindrances leads to joy, an important element of meditation.

==== Seven factors of awakening ====
The other main contemplation shared by all versions of the satipaṭṭhāna formula is mindfulness of the seven factors of awakening (satta bojjhaṅgā). The contemplation is similar to that of the hindrances. First, one is aware of the presence or absence of each of these factors. Then one also contemplates how these factors arise, how they can be maintained and how they can be further developed, that is to say, one develops an "awareness to the conditions that are related to their presence or absence."

Early sources such as SĀ 729 and SN 46.27 state that one cultivates these awakening factors "supported by seclusion, supported by dispassion, and supported by cessation, culminating in letting go." This indicates that a successful cultivation of these factors leads to awakening if they each one is cultivated while being supported by three elements: seclusion from unwholesome actions, dispassion as the fading away of craving, and the gradual cessation of dukkha.

The awakening factors are positive qualities associated with wisdom that stand in opposition to the hindrances (associated with darkness and lack of wisdom, see SN 46.40 and SĀ 706). The Aggi-sutta and its parallel at SĀ 714 indicate that particular awakening factors (investigation of dhammas, energy, joy) can be used as antidotes to sluggishness while other factors (tranquillity, concentration, equanimity) are antidotes for agitation. This does not work the other way around, that is to say, awakening factors that are useful against agitation are not useful to cultivate when one is sluggish and vice versa. The awakening factor of mindfulness meanwhile is useful in all circumstances. Indeed, according to Kaṭukurunde Ñāṇananda, "mindfulness stands in the middle and orders the other faculties, here too it comes to the forefront and marshals those factors that are behind it."

Furthermore, the hindrance of doubt is also countered by the factor of investigation. When all hindrances are absent, one is then able to cultivate all seven factors at once. SĀ 718 and SN 46.4 indicate that mastering the awakening factors requires learning how to make use of each one of them in different circumstances. These suttas illustrate this with the simile of a king that dresses in various clothes throughout the day according to his needs.

Various discourses including SĀ 715 and SN 46.51 discuss how the seven awakening factors are to be nourished and developed. For example, mindfulness is nourished by the four satipaṭṭhānas, investigation is nourished by distinguishing wholesome things from unwholesome things, and energy is nourished through the four right efforts.

Furthermore, according to the Anāpānasati-sutta and its Saṃyukta-āgama parallel, the sequence in which the factors are listed seems to correspond to how they unfold through practice. According to Analayo, "this sequence reflects an underlying progression in which the factor mentioned earlier supports the arising of the factor that comes next." However, this progression is not a strict one. Kaṭukurunde Ñāṇananda states that "it does not mean that one has to develop the first category first and then after a time the next category and so on. But still there is a certain order in the development – an ascending order, one may say."

== Practice ==
=== Process view ===
According to Sujato, Satipaṭṭhāna is "a prescription of how to practice," which "introduces certain specific objects of meditation." Likewise, according to Thanissaro Bhikkhu, the "four frames of reference" (satipaṭṭhāna) are "a set of teachings that show where a meditator should focus attention and how."

Anālayo and Sujato both note that these four meditation subjects provide a progressive refinement of contemplation from coarse elements (the body) to increasingly subtler and more refined subjects. Likewise, Gethin writes that there is "a movement from clear awareness of the more immediately accessible realms of experience to an awareness of what the Nikayas see as subtler and deeper realms."

However, Anālayo also argues that this pattern "does not prescribe the only possible way of practising satipaṭṭhāna," since this would "severely limit the range of one's practice." This is because, "a central characteristic of satipaṭṭhāna is awareness of phenomena as they are, and as they occur. Although such awareness will naturally proceed from the gross to the subtle, in actual practice it will quite probably vary from the sequence depicted in the discourse." Anālayo sees the four satipaṭṭhānas as flexible and mutually supportive practices. Therefore, according to Anālayo "the sequence in which they are practised may be altered in order to meet the needs of each individual meditator." All four may even be combined into a single practice, as documented by the Ānāpānasati Sutta.

Thanissaro Bhikkhu argues that an element of mindfulness practice includes learning how to maximize skillful qualities and how to minimize unskillful qualities, which might require one to "manipulate and experiment" with different mental qualities and meditation methods. Therefore, Thanissaro argues that mindfulness meditation can also be an active process of learning various skillful ways of directing the mind by cultivating certain perceptions and ideas (such as asubha). Thanissaro compares this process to how "one learns about eggs by trying to cook with them, gathering experience from one's successes and failures in attempting increasingly difficult dishes." Eventually, as one gains mastery of the mind, one is able to transcend even the need for skillful manipulation of mental qualities.

=== Practice instructions ===
The Satipaṭṭhāna Sutta states that one first goes to a secluded place, like a forest or an empty hut. U Sīlānanda states that a place away from human habitation and the noises of towns and cities is the most suitable place for satipaṭṭhāna meditation.

The definition of how one practices satipaṭṭhāna in the early texts uses the term anupassanā which refers to "sustained observation" of each subject of meditation. Anālayo defines this term which is derived from the verb “to see” (passati) as meaning “to repeatedly look at”, that is, “to contemplate” or “to closely observe.” Furthermore, he interprets this as referring to "a particular way of meditation, an examination of the observed object from a particular viewpoint" which "emphasize how the object is to be perceived" (such as seeing the body as unattractive or impermanent for example). Thanissaro translates anupassanā as "remaining focused" and “keeping track,” which "denotes the element of concentration in the practice, as one tries to stay with one particular theme in the midst of the welter of experience."

All versions of the Satipaṭṭhāna Sutta also indicate that each satipaṭṭhāna is to be contemplated first "internally" (ajjhatta), then "externally" (bahiddhā), and finally both internally and externally. This is generally understood as observing oneself and observing other persons, an interpretation which is supported by Abhidharma works (including the Vibhaṅga and the Dharmaskandha) as well as by several suttas (MN 104, DĀ 4, DĀ 18 and DN 18). Others interpret this passage as referring to mental (internal) phenomena and to phenomena associated with the senses (external), which according to Anālayo, does have some support from the suttas.

According to Gethin, the passage refers to observing ourselves and other persons: "the bhikkhu, then, first watches his own body, feelings, mind and dhammas, next those of others, and finally his own and those of others together." One example which indicates how this is to be understood is the practice of death meditation, which can be done in a charnel ground by looking at dead bodies (external contemplation) and also by contemplating the death of one's own body (internal). According to Gethin, this practice leads to "the blurring of distinctions between self and other" which arises as one begins to understand the world as being made up of impermanent and insubstantial processes. Anālayo concurs, stating that this contemplation can lead to the abandoning of the boundary between "I" and "other", "leading to a comprehensive vision of phenomena as such, independent of any sense of ownership."

Regarding the question of how one is supposed to observe the feelings and mental states of other people, Anālayo argues that one can cultivate this by "carefully observing their outer manifestations" since feelings and mental states do influence the facial expression, tone of voice, and physical posture. He cites suttas such as DN 28 as evidence that the early discourses hold that one may infer the mental state of others by watching their external manifestations. Anālayo also notes that balancing internal and external contemplation is important because it can prevent a one sided awareness focused on one domain (self-centredness or lack of introspection respectively). Balancing both fields of mindfulness can thus "achieve a skilful balance between introversion and extroversion."

Thanissaro Bhikkhu outlines how all the different elements of mindfulness meditation come together as follows:

“Mindful” (satima) literally means being able to remember or recollect. Here it means keeping one's task in mind. The task here is a dual one—remaining focused on one's frame of reference [satipaṭṭhāna], and putting aside the distractions of greed and distress that would come from shifting one's frame of reference back to the world. In other words, one tries to stay with the phenomenology of immediate experience, without slipping back into the narratives and world views that make up one's sense of the world. In essence, this is a concentration practice, with the three qualities of ardency, alertness, and mindfulness devoted to attaining concentration. Mindfulness keeps the theme of the meditation in mind, alertness observes the theme as it is present to awareness, and also is aware of when the mind has slipped from its theme. Mindfulness then remembers where the mind should be focused, and ardency tries to return the mind to its proper theme—and to keep it there—as quickly and skillfully as possible. In this way, these three qualities help to seclude the mind from sensual preoccupations and unskillful mental qualities, thus bringing it to the first jhana.

=== Auxiliary qualities ===
In the early texts, the satipaṭṭhānas are said to be practiced with specific mental qualities. This is listed in the Pali version in what Sujato calls the "auxiliary formula" which states that one contemplates (anupassī) each satipaṭṭhāna with the following four qualities: ardency or diligence (ātāpī), clear comprehension (sampajāna), mindfulness (sati), and "free from desires and discontent (vineyya abhijjhādomanassa)" (with some variation across the different sources). In many of the alternative forms of the auxiliary formula, samādhi is mentioned as the result of the practice (e.g. in DN 18.26/DA 4 and in SN 47.8/SA 616).

The term ātāpī is associated with the concept of tapas (ascetic power) and it is said to be related to heroic strength, effort or energy (viriya) in the Nettipakarana. It is thus associated with skillful effort and wholesome desire or resolve. It is best understood as a "balanced but sustained application of energy" according to Anālayo. Thanissaro Bhikkhu defines it as "the factor of effort or exertion...which contains an element of discernment in its ability to distinguish skillful from unskillful mental qualities." U Sīlānanda glosses ātāpī as "you must be energetic, put forth effort to be mindful."

The second quality, sampajāna, means to know something clearly or thoroughly so that one has "the ability to fully grasp or comprehend what is taking place". This can refer to basic forms of knowing (such as being aware of one's posture) as well as more discriminative forms of understanding (such as comprehending the five hindrances). According to Thanissaro, this "means being clearly aware of what is happening in the present."

According to Gethin, "having removed covetousness and aversion for the world" is associated with the abandoning of the five hindrances as well as with the attainment of the jhanas as can be seen in suttas like MN 125 which directly associate these elements of the path. According to U Sīlānanda, this passage refers to a temporary removal of the five hindrances as a preliminary for meditation." The Ekottarika-āgama version states that one practices satipaṭṭhāna while "removing evil thoughts and being free from worry and sorrow, one experiences joy in oneself." Anālayo also associates this element with the development of samādhi. This is supported by the Nettippakarana (Nett 82) as well as by various suttas which contain a variation of the auxiliary formula which explicitly mentions samadhi such as SN 47.4).

Anālayo also notes that the abandonment of covetousness and aversion is associated with the practice of restraint of the senses in the early discourses (such as in MN 39). This is a stage of practice prior to formal meditation, in which "the meditator guards the sense doors in order to prevent sense impressions from leading to desires and discontent." The goal in the initial stages of practice is to develop a sense of "inner equipoise within which desires and discontent are held at bay." Anālayo further notes that "although sense-restraint precedes proper meditation practice in the gradual path scheme, this does not imply that sense-restraint is completed at an exact point in time, only after which one moves on to formal practice. In actual practice the two overlap to a considerable degree." Likewise, Sujato associates this element with "the preliminary subduing" of the five hindrances through sense restraint to prepare the mind for mindfulness meditation.

=== Contemplation of impermanence ===
The Theravada Satipaṭṭhāna Sutta, as well as the Ekottarika-āgama version preserved in Chinese contain instructions to contemplate the arising and disappearance of the meditation subject (i.e. impermanence, anicca). The Madhyama-āgama version does not contain this instruction, but does mention that on practicing mindfulness "one is endowed with knowledge, vision, understanding, and penetration." Sujato thinks that this instruction to practice contemplation of impermanence reflects a later sectarian development that began to associate satipaṭṭhāna more closely with vipassanā. Analayo on the other hand thinks that contemplation of impermanence (aniccasaññā) "should be considered an integral aspect of satipaṭṭhāna practice." He cites the Śāriputrābhidharma and the Ānāpānasati-sutta (and its parallels) as other sources which indicate that contemplation of impermanence is a part of satipaṭṭhāna practice.

Furthermore, Anālayo states that awareness of impermanence (which is an aspect of right view) also leads to insight into anatta and dukkha. Gethin notes that the practice of observing the arising and falling of phenomena is "particularly associated with the gaining of the insight that leads directly to the destruction of the asavas, directly to awakening." He also notes how various other suttas state that the practice of the four satipaṭṭhānas are directly linked with the destruction of the asavas.

== Influence ==
=== Modern Theravāda ===
The four satipaṭṭhānas are regarded as fundamental in modern Theravāda Buddhism and the Vipassana or Insight Meditation Movement. In the Pali Canon, mindfulness meditation and satipaṭṭhāna are seen as ways to develop the mental factors of samatha ("calm", "serenity") and vipassana ("insight").

According to Bhikkhu Sujato, there is a particularly popular interpretation of mindfulness meditation in modern Theravāda which he calls the vipassanāvāda (the vipassanā-doctrine). According to Sujato, this widespread modernist view can be summarized as follows:

The Buddha taught two systems of meditation, samatha and vipassanā. Samatha was taught before the Buddha (so is not really Buddhist), it is dangerous (because one can easily get attached to the bliss), and it is unnecessary (because vipassanā alone can develop the access samādhi necessary to suppress the hindrances). Vipassanā is the true key to liberation taught by the Buddha. This method was pre-eminently taught in the Satipaṭṭhāna Sutta, the most important discourse taught by the Buddha on meditation and on practice in everyday life. The essence of this practice is the moment-to-moment awareness of the rise and fall of all mind-body phenomena. Thus satipaṭṭhāna and vipassanā are virtually synonyms.

Tse-fu Kuan also writes that it is a "widely held opinion in Theravada Buddhism that serenity meditation is not essential for the realization of Nirvana". Kuan cites Theravada authors such as Ven. Rahula, Ven. Silananda and Nyanaponika as figures who support some version of this view. In contrast to this, Kuan argues that "there is probably no explicit indication in the Canon that one can achieve liberation by the practice of sati alone without the attainment of the jhānas."

According to Kuan, this "bare insight" view arose due to "the tendency in the tradition to redefine “liberation by wisdom” (paññāvimutti) as being liberated by insight alone without high meditative attainments, although “liberation by wisdom” originally did not mean so." That liberation by wisdom did not originally mean liberation without jhana has also been argued by Cousins and Gombrich.

Anālayo writes that certain modern Theravada meditation teachers "emphasize the “dry insight” approach, dispensing with the formal development of mental calm." He writes that some teachers of this dry insight approach describe the practice of mindfulness as “attacking” its object or "plunging into it". He cites U Pandita who writes that satipaṭṭhāna practice means to “attack the object without hesitation ... with violence, speed or great force ... with excessive haste or hurry.” Analayo thinks this mistaken understanding of mindfulness "arose because of a misreading or misinterpretation of a particular term". This is related to the interpretation of the Abhidhamma term apilāpeti (plunging) in the Theravada commentaries. Analayo agrees with Gethin, who argues instead for a reading of apilapati (or abhilapati) which means "reminding".

Furthermore, even though the early discourses support the idea that one can attain stream entry without having developed the jhanas (mainly by listening to a discourse by the Buddha), Anālayo argues that "for satipaṭṭhāna to unfold its full potential of leading to non-returning or full awakening [arahantship], the development of absorption is required."

Sujato notes that not all modern Theravāda meditation traditions accept this dichotomy of samatha and vipassanā. According to Sujato, the teachers of the Thai forest tradition instead emphasize how samatha and vipassanā are complementary factors which must be practiced together. This is closer to how these two aspects of meditation are understood in the early Buddhist texts.

Similarly, Thanissaro Bhikkhu notes that:

Although satipaṭṭhāna practice is often said to be separate from the practice of jhāna, a number of suttas—such as MN 125 and AN 8:63—equate the successful completion of this first stage [of satipaṭṭhāna practice] with the attainment of the first level of jhāna. This point is confirmed by the many suttas—MN 118 among them—describing how the practice of satipaṭṭhāna brings to completion the factors for awakening, which coincide with the factors of jhāna.

According to Buddhadasa Bhikkhu, the aim of mindfulness is to stop the arising of disturbing thoughts and emotions, which arise from sense-contact.

According to the theory of Theravada Buddhism, in the period of 5000 years after the parinirvana of Buddha, we can still attain Sotāpanna or even Arhat through practicing Satipatthana, and Satipatthana is the only way out.

=== In Indo-Tibetan Buddhism ===
The four establishments of mindfulness also known as "the four close placements of mindfulness" (dran-pa nyer-bzhag) are also taught in Indo Tibetan Buddhism as they are part of the 37 factors leading to a purified state (byang-chub yan-lag so-bdun). They are discussed in Tibetan commentaries on Śāntideva's Bodhicaryāvatāra, such as Pawo Tsugla Trengwa Rinpoche's 16th century commentary and Kunzang Pelden's (1862–1943) commentary The Nectar of Manjushri's Speech.

The Tibetan canon also contains a True Dharma Application of Mindfulness Sutra (Tohoku Catalogue # 287, dam chos dran pa nyer bzhag, saddharmasmṛtyupasthānasutra). This sutra is cited by various Tibetan Buddhist figures, such as Atisha (in his Open Basket of Jewels) and the Third Dzogchen Rinpoche (1759–1792). It is also cited as a sutra of the first turning by Khedrup Je (1385–1438 CE).

This sutra is a large text that dates from between the second and fourth centuries CE. It survives in Tibetan, Chinese and Sanskrit manuscripts. It is a complex and heterogeneous Mulasarvastivada text with various topics, such as long descriptions of the various realms in Buddhist cosmology, discussions of karma theory, meditation and ethics. The earliest layer of the text, which can be found in chapter two, contains the core meditation teachings of the text, which include an extensive exposition of six elements (dhatus) meditation, meditations on feeling (vedana), meditations on the skandhas and ayatanas, meditation on the mind and impermanence, and other meditation topics organized into a structure of ten levels (bhumi).

According to Jigme Lingpa's (1730–1798) Treasury of Precious Qualities, the four applications of mindfulness are emphasized during the path of accumulation and in Mahayana are practiced with a focus on emptiness:

"If one practices according to the Hinayana, one meditates on the impurity of the body, on the feelings of sufferings, on the impermanence of consciousness and on the fact that mental objects are "ownerless" (there is no self to which they belong). If one practices according to the Mahayana, during the meditation session one meditates on the same things as being spacelike, beyond all conceptual constructs. In the post-meditation period one considers them as illusory and dreamlike."

The general presentation of this practice in the Indo-Tibetan Buddhist tradition focuses on cultivating śamatha first, and then practicing vipaśyanā. Examples of contemporary figures in Indo-Tibetan Buddhism that have taught this practice include Chogyam Trungpa who often taught these practices in the USA and Dzogchen Ponlop Rinpoche, a contemporary Tibetan lama. They have also been taught by the 14th Dalai Lama and students of his like Alexander Berzin and Thubten Chodron.

The four applications of mindfulness are also discussed by Nyingma scholars like as Rong-zom-pa (eleventh century), Longchenpa (1308–1364), and Ju Mipham (1846–1912). These authors describe specifically Vajrayana modes of the four smṛtyupasthānas, which have been adapted to the Vajrayana philosophy.

These four "mantric" smṛtyupasthānas described by Mipham are summarized by Dorji Wangchuk as follows:

(1) Contemplating (blo bzhag pa) the physical bodies of oneself and others as being characterized by primordial or intrinsic purity (dag pa), on the one hand, and by emptiness (stong pa nyid), freedom from manifoldness (spros bral), great homogeneity (mnyam pa chen po), and integrality (zung du ’jug pa), on the other, is called kāyasmṛtyupasthāna.

(2) Transforming “conceptual constructions whose occurrence one feels/senses (or is aware of)” (byung tshor gyi rtog pa) into gnosis characterized by great bliss (bde ba chen po’i ye shes) is called vedanāsmṛtyupasthāna.

(3) Channelling or containing/constraining (sdom pa) all kinds of manifoldness associated with mind and mental factors into/in/to the innate sphere of the luminous nature of the mind is called cittasmṛtyupasthāna.

(4) Conducting oneself in a way (or with an attitude) that all saṃsāric and nirvāṇic, universal and particular phenomena are pure and equal and hence beyond adoption or rejection, is dharmasmṛtyupasthāna.

== See also ==
- Satipatthana Sutta, also called the Four Satipatthanas
- Metta Sutta
- Kayagatasati Sutta
- Anapanasati Sutta
- Bodhipakkhiya dhamma
- Buddhist meditation
- Kammatthana
- Kōan
- Metta
- Mindfulness
- Samatha
- Buddhist paths to liberation
- Vipassana

== Notes ==
Subnotes

== Sources ==
=== Printed sources ===
- Anālayo (2006), Satipatthāna: The Direct Path to Realization (PDF), Birmingham: Windhorse Publications, ISBN 1-899579-54-0
- Anālayo (2013), Perspectives on Satipatthāna (PDF), Cambridge: Windhorse Publications, ISBN 978-1-909314-03-0
- Arbel, Keren (2017), Early Buddhist Meditation: The Four Jhanas as the Actualization of Insight, Routledge
- Bronkhorst, Johannes (1985), "Dharma and Abhidharma", Bulletin of the School of Oriental and African Studies, 48 (2): 305–320
- Bronkhorst, Johannes (1993), The Two Traditions Of Meditation In Ancient India, Motilal Banarsidass Publ.
- Buddhadasa Bhikkhu (2014), Heartwood of the Bodhi Tree, Wisdom publications
- Gethin, Rupert (1992), The Buddhist Path to Awakening, OneWorld Publications
- Gethin, R. M. L. (2001), The Buddhist Path to Awakening: A Study of the Bodhi-Pakkhiyā Dhammā, Oneworld Publications, ISBN 1-85168-285-6
- Gombrich, Richard F. (1996), How Buddhism Began: The Conditioned Genesis of the Early Teachings
- Gunaratana, Henepola (2012), The Four Foundations of Mindfulness in Plain English, Boston: Wisdom Pub., ISBN 978-1-61429-038-4
- Gyori, Thomas I. (1996), The Foundations of Mindfulness (Satipatthāna) as a Microcosm of the Theravāda Buddhist World View (M.A. dissertatio, Washington: American University
- Kuan, Tse-fu (2008), Mindfulness in Early Buddhism: New Approaches through Psychology and Textual Analysis of Pāli, Chinese and Sanskrit Sources, Routledge, ISBN 978-0-415-43737-0
- Nyanaponika (2014) [1962], The Heart of Buddhist Meditation., Kandy, Sri Lanka: Weiser Books, ISBN 978-1578635580
- Polak, Grzegorz (2011), Reexamining Jhana: Towards a Critical Reconstruction of Early Buddhist Soteriology, UMCS
- Rose, Kenneth (2016), Yoga, Meditation, and Mysticism: Contemplative Universals and Meditative Landmarks, Bloomsbury
- Shankman, Richard (2008), The Experience of Samadhi: An In-depth Exploration of Buddhist Meditation, Shambhala
- Sharf, Robert (October 2014), "Mindfulness and Mindlessness in Early Chan" (PDF), Philosophy East and West, 64 (4): 933–964, doi:10.1353/pew.2014.0074, S2CID 144208166
- Sujato (2012), A History of Mindfulness, How insight worsted tranquillity in the Satipaṭṭhāna Sutta (PDF), Santipada
- Sīlānanda (2012), The Four Foundations of Mindfulness, Simon and Schuster
- Vetter, Tilmann (1988), The Ideas and Meditative Practices of Early Buddhism, BRILL
- Williams, Paul; Tribe, Anthony (2000), Buddhist Thought, Routledge
