= Maraṇasati =

Buddhist meditation about death

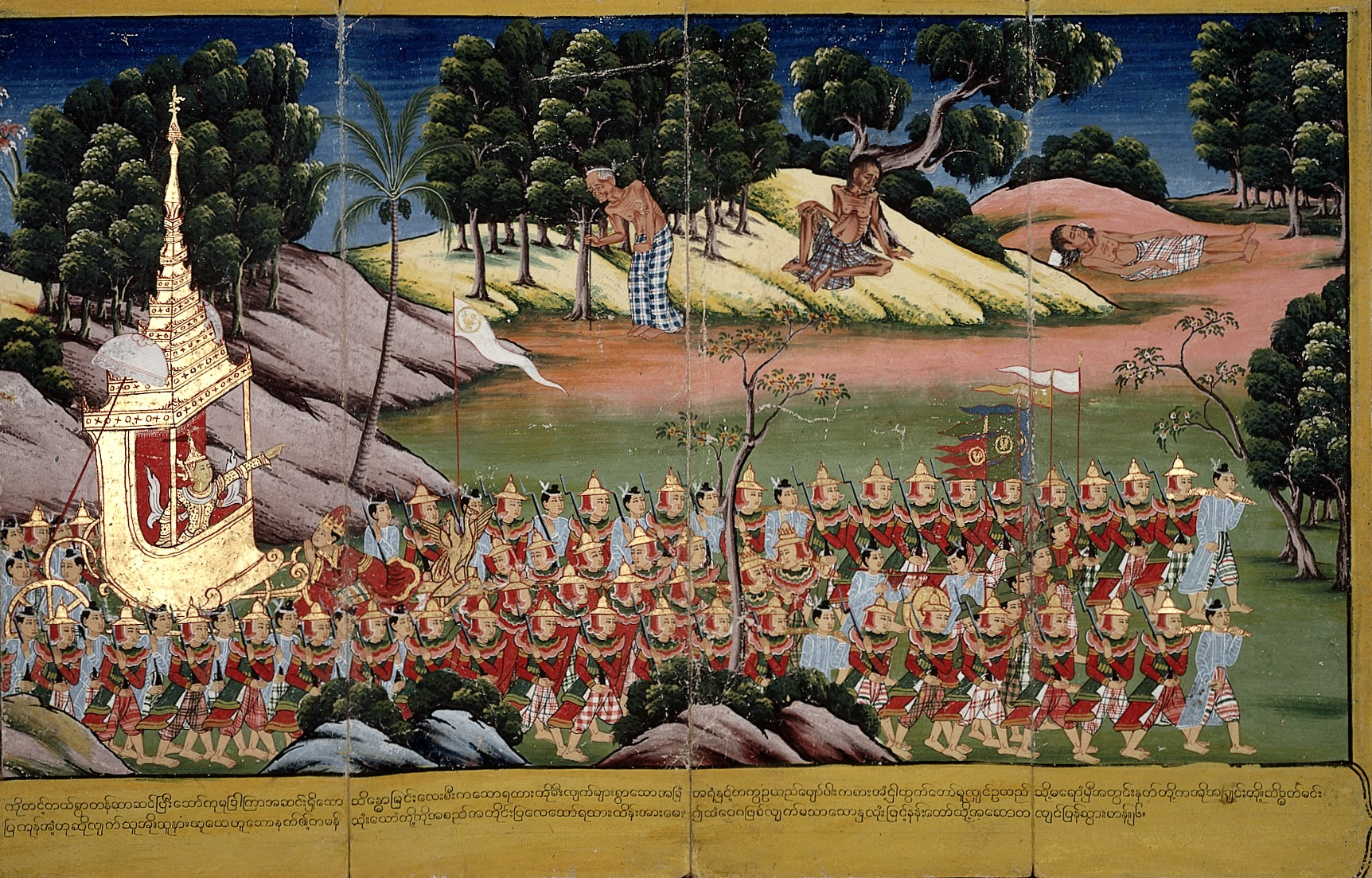
Prince Siddhattha sees the three signs, an old man, a sick man and a corpse, that lead to his renunciation of secular life. From a Konbaung Burmese illustration

Maraṇasati or maraṇassati ("mindfulness of death", or "death awareness") is a Buddhist meditation practice of frequently keeping in mind that death can strike at any time (AN 6.20), and that we should practice assiduously (appamāda) and with urgency in every moment, even in the time it takes to draw one breath. Not being diligent every moment is called negligence by the Buddha (AN 6.19). In the earliest discourses of the Buddha, the term 'Maranasati' is only explicitly defined twice, in the two suttas AN 6.19 and AN 6.20.

Later Buddhist schools have expanded the meaning of 'maranasati' to include various visualization and contemplation techniques to meditate on the nature of death. The cultivation of Maranasati is said to be conducive to right effort, and also helpful in developing a sense of spiritual urgency (saṃvega) and renunciation (nekkhamma).

== Theravada Buddhism ==
Mindfulness of death is a common practice in Southeast Asian Buddhist monasteries. Buddhist monasteries such as Wat Pah Nanachat will often have human skeletons on display in the meditation hall.

=== In the Pali Canon ===
==== Mindfulness of death ====
In the Paṭhama-maraṇassati Sutta (AN 6.19), the Buddha advises developing mindfulness of death diligently (appamāda) and with urgency at every moment, even in the brief time it takes to draw a single breath. Failing to maintain this constant contemplation means one is said to 'live negligently.'

“
When this was said, the Buddha said to those mendicants:

“As to the mendicants who develop mindfulness of death by wishing to live for a day and night … or to live for a day … or to live as long as it takes to eat a meal of almsfood … or to live as long as it takes to chew and swallow four or five mouthfuls—these are called mendicants who live negligently. They slackly develop mindfulness of death for the ending of defilements.

But as to the mendicants who develop mindfulness of death by wishing to live as long as it takes to chew and swallow a single mouthful … or to live as long as it takes to breathe out after breathing in, or to breathe in after breathing out—these are called mendicants who live diligently. They keenly develop mindfulness of death for the ending of defilements.

So you should train like this: ‘We will live diligently. We will keenly develop mindfulness of death for the ending of defilements.’ That’s how you should train.”

”
— Paṭhamamaraṇassati Sutta, AN 6.19
tr. Bhikkhu Sujato

According to the Dutiya-maraṇassati Sutta (AN 6.20), a monk should reflect on the many possibilities which could bring him to death, and then turn his thoughts to the unskillful mental qualities he has yet to abandon. "Suppose your clothes (turban) or head were on fire. In order to extinguish it, you’d apply extraordinary enthusiasm (chanda), effort (vāyāma), zeal (ussāha), vigor (ussoḷhi), perseverance (appaṭivāni), mindfulness (sati), and situational awareness (sampajañña) in order to give up those bad, unskillful qualities."

==== Charnel ground contemplations ====
The Satipatthana Sutta (MN 10) and the Kayagata-sati Sutta (MN 119) include sections on cemetery contemplations which focus on nine stages of corpse decomposition (Pali: nava sīvathikā-manasikāra). These are:

1. A corpse that is "swollen, blue and festering."
2. A corpse that is "being eaten by crows, hawks, vultures, dogs, jackals or by different kinds of worms."
3. A corpse that is "reduced to a skeleton together with (some) flesh and blood held in by the tendons."
4. A corpse that is "reduced to a blood-besmeared skeleton without flesh but held in by the tendons."
5. A corpse that is "reduced to a skeleton held in by the tendons but without flesh and not besmeared with blood."
6. A corpse that is "reduced to bones gone loose, scattered in all directions."
7. A corpse that is "reduced to bones, white in color like a conch."
8. A corpse that is "reduced to bones more than a year old, heaped together."
9. A corpse that is "reduced to bones gone rotten and become dust."

The Satipatthana Sutta instructs the meditator to reflect thus: 'This body of mine, too, is of the same nature as that body, is going to be like that body, and has not got past the condition of becoming like that body.'

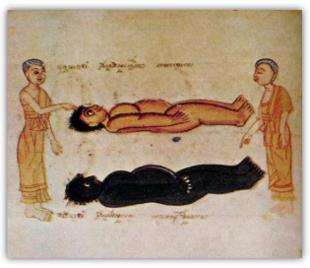
Illustration of mindfulness of death using corpses in a charnel ground, a subset of mindfulness of the body, the first satipatthana. From an early-20th-century manuscript found in Chaiya District, Surat Thani Province, Thailand.

=== In Buddhaghosa's Visuddhimagga ===
According to Buddhaghosa's Visuddhimagga, there are eight ways of meditating on death:

1. meditating on death as a murderer, since it takes away life;
2. meditating on it as the ruin of success;
3. viewing it by comparison with famous persons, reflecting that even these great ones eventually died, even the enlightened ones themselves;
4. meditating on the body as the abode of many--many worms as well as the target of many others;
5. meditating on the difficulty of keeping alive;
6. meditating on it as without occasion, since beings die unpredictably;
7. meditating on the shortness of a lifetime;
8. meditating on the fact that, properly speaking (in an ultimate sense), the lifetime of a being is a single moment of consciousness, that one dies every moment, so to speak.

== Tibetan Buddhism ==
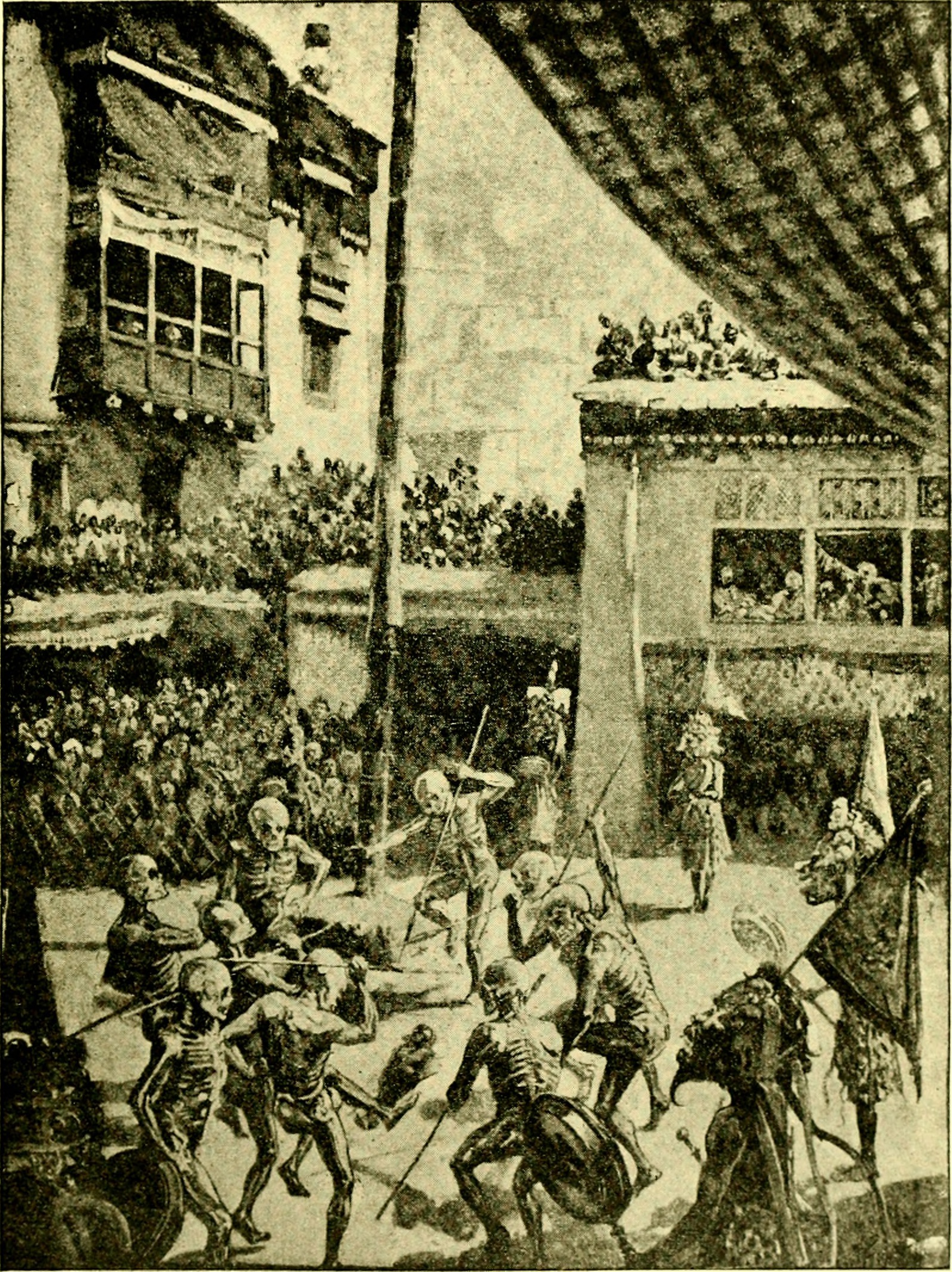
Illustration of a Tibetan Cham dance of skeleton spirits, who serve as a reminder of the presence of death

Mindfulness of death is a central teaching of Tibetan Buddhism: it is one of the "Four Thoughts," which turn the mind towards spiritual practice. One set of Tibetan Buddhist contemplations on death come from the eleventh century Buddhist scholar Atisha. Atisha is said to have said to his students that if a person is unaware of death, their meditation will have little power.

Atisha's contemplations on death:

1. Death is inevitable.
2. Our life span is decreasing continuously.
3. Death will come, whether or not we are prepared for it.
4. Human life expectancy is uncertain.
5. There are many causes of death.
6. The human body is fragile and vulnerable.
7. At the time of death, our material resources are not of use to us.
8. Our loved ones cannot keep us from death.
9. Our own body cannot help us at the time of our death.

Other Tibetan Buddhist practices deal directly with the moment of death, preparing the meditator for entering and navigating the Bardo, the intermediate stage between life and death. This is the theme of the popular Great Liberation through hearing during the intermediate state (Tibetan Book of the Dead).

== See also ==
- Memento mori
- Right Effort
- Viriya
