= Patikulamanasikara =

Form of Buddhist meditation and contemplation

Translations of Patikulamanasikara
- Pali: Paṭikkūlamanasikāra
- Chinese: 不淨觀 (Pinyin: Bù jìng guān)
- Japanese: 不浄観 (Rōmaji: Fujōkan)
- Sinhala: පටික්කූලමනසිකාරය, පිළිකුල් භාවනාව (Patikulamanasikaraya, Pilikul Bhavanava)
- Vietnamese: Quán bất tịnh, Niệm 32 thể trược

Paṭik(k)ūlamanasikāra is a Pāli term that is generally translated as "reflections on repulsiveness". It refers to a traditional Buddhist meditation whereby thirty-one parts of the body are contemplated in a variety of ways. In addition to developing sati (mindfulness) and samādhi (concentration), this form of meditation is considered conducive to overcoming desire and lust. Along with cemetery contemplations such as the contemplation of the nine stages of decay, this type of meditation is one of the two meditations on "the foul" or "unattractive" (Pāli: asubha).

== Translation ==
Paṭikkūla (Pāli) literally means "against" (paṭi) "the slope" or "embankment" (kūla) and has been translated adjectivally as "averse, objectionable, contrary, disagreeable" and, in its nounal form, as "loathsomeness, impurity".

Manasikāra (Pāli), derived from manasi (locative of mana thus, loosely, "in mind" or "in thought") and karoti ("to make" or "to bring into") and has been translated as "attention" or "pondering" or "fixed thought".

In contemporary translations, the compound term paṭikkūla-manasikāra is generally translated as "reflections on repulsiveness" or, adding contextual clarity at the expense of literal accuracy, "reflections on repulsiveness of the body". Alternate translations include "attention directed to repulsiveness" and "realisation of the impurity of the body".

== Benefits ==
This type of meditation is traditionally mentioned as an "antidote" to sensual passion. This is also one of the "four protective meditations", along with anussati (recollection of the Buddha), mettā (benevolence) practice and recollection of death, maraṇasati.

In individual discourses, this type of contemplation is identified as a contributor to a variety of mundane and transcendental goals. For instance, in the Girimananda Sutta (AN 10.60), Ananda's recitation of this and other contemplations immediately cures an ailing monk. In the Sampasadaniya Sutta (DN 28), Ven. Sariputta declares that meditating on these 31 body parts leads to "the attainment of vision, in four ways", and briefly outlines how this method can be used as a springboard by which one "comes to know the unbroken stream of human consciousness that is not established either in this world or in the next". In addition, in the Iddhipāda-samyutta's Vibhanga Sutta (SN 51.20), this meditation subject is used to develop the four bases of power (iddhipāda) by which one is able to achieve liberation from suffering.

While the Pali Canon invariably includes this form of contemplation in its various lists of mindfulness meditation techniques, the compendious fifth-century Visuddhimagga identifies this type of contemplation (along with anapanasati) as one of the few body-directed meditations particularly suited to the development of samādhi (Vism. VIII, 43).

== Practice ==
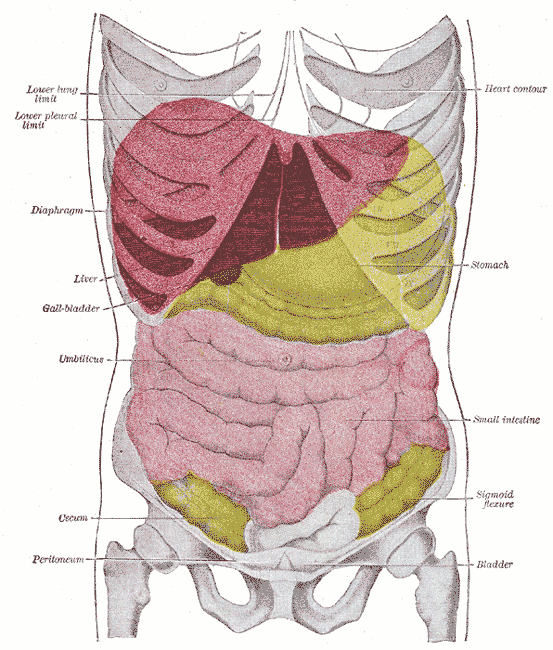
Internal organs viewed from front: lungs (grey), heart (white), liver (purple), stomach (yellow), large intestine (yellow) and small intestine (pink), from Gray's Anatomy.

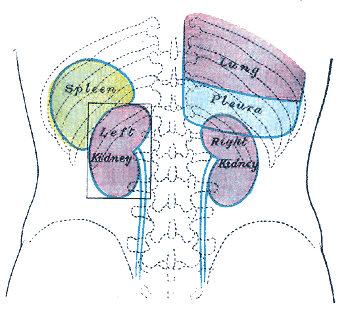
Internal organs viewed from back: spleen (green), kidneys (purple), right lower lung (purple) and pleura (blue), from Gray's Anatomy.

In Buddhist scriptures, this practice involves mentally identifying 31 parts of the body, contemplated upon in various ways.

=== Objects of contemplation ===
This meditation involves meditating on 31 different body parts:

head hairs (Pali: kesā), body hairs (lomā), nails (nakhā), teeth (dantā), skin (taco),
flesh (maṃsaṃ), tendons (nahāru), bones (aṭṭhi), bone marrow (aṭṭhimiñjaṃ), kidneys (vakkaṃ),
heart (hadayaṃ), liver (yakanaṃ), pleura (kilomakaṃ), spleen (pihakaṃ), lungs (papphāsaṃ),
entrails (antaṃ), mesentery (antaguṇaṃ), undigested food (udariyaṃ), feces (karīsaṃ),
bile (pittaṃ), phlegm (semhaṃ), pus (pubbo), blood (lohitaṃ), sweat (sedo), fat (medo),
tears (assu), skin-oil (vasā), saliva (kheḷo), mucus (siṅghānikā), fluid in the joints (lasikā), urine (muttaṃ).

In a few discourses, these 31 body parts are contextualized within the framework of the mahābhūta (the elements) so that the earth element is exemplified by the body parts from head hair to feces, and the water element is exemplified by bile through urine.

A few other discourses preface contemplation of these 31 body parts in the following manner: "Herein ... a monk contemplates this body upward from the soles of the feet, downward from the top of the hair, enclosed in skin, as being full of many impurities."

The 31 identified body parts in pātikūlamanasikāra contemplation are the same as the first 31 body parts identified in the "Dvattimsakara" ("32 Parts [of the Body]") verse (Khp. 3) regularly recited by monks. The thirty-second body part identified in the latter verse is the brain (matthaluṅga). The Visuddhimagga suggests the enumeration of the 31 body parts implicitly includes the brain in aṭṭhimiñjaṃ, which is traditionally translated as "bone marrow".

=== Methods of contemplation ===
A canonical formulation of how to meditate on these parts follows:

"Just as if a sack with openings at both ends were full of various kinds of grain – wheat, rice, mung beans, kidney beans, sesame seeds, husked rice – and a man with good eyesight, pouring it out, were to reflect, 'This is wheat. This is rice. These are mung beans. These are kidney beans. These are sesame seeds. This is husked rice'; in the same way, the monk reflects on this very body from the soles of the feet on up, from the crown of the head on down, surrounded by skin and full of various kinds of unclean things [as identified in the above enumeration of bodily organs and fluids]...."

In regards to this and other body-centered meditation objects, the Satipatthana Sutta (DN 22) provides the following additional context and expected results:

In this way [a monk] remains focused internally on the body in & of itself, or externally on the body in & of itself, or both internally & externally on the body in & of itself. Or he remains focused on the phenomenon of origination with regard to the body, on the phenomenon of passing away with regard to the body, or on the phenomenon of origination & passing away with regard to the body. Or his mindfulness that 'There is a body' is maintained to the extent of knowledge & remembrance. And he remains independent, unsustained by (not clinging to) anything in the world...."

According to the post-canonical Pali atthakatha (commentary) on the Satipatthana Sutta, one can develop "seven kinds of skill in study" regarding these meditation objects through:

1. repetition of the body parts verbally
2. repetition of the body parts mentally
3. discerning the body parts individually in terms of each one's color
4. discerning the body parts individually in terms of each one's shape
5. discerning if a body part is above or below the navel (or both)
6. discerning the body part's spatial location
7. spatially and functionally juxtaposing two body parts

== Traditional sources ==
The name for this type of meditation is found in the sectional titles used in the Mahasatipatthana Sutta (Dīgha Nikāya 22) and the Satipatthana Sutta (MN 10), where the contemplation of the 32 body parts is entitled, Paṭikkūla-manasikāra-pabbaṃ (which, word-for-word, can be translated as "repulsiveness-reflection-section"). Subsequently, in the post-canonical Visuddhimagga and other atthakatha works, paṭikkūlamanasikāra is explicitly used when referring to this technique.

This form of meditation is mentioned in the following suttas in the Pāli Canon (listed in order of nikāya and then sutta number within nikaya):

- Mahasatipatthana Sutta ("The Great Frames of Reference", Dīgha Nikāya 22)
- Sampasadaniya Sutta ("Serene Faith", DN 28)
- Satipatthana Sutta ("Frames of References", Majjhima Nikaya 10).
- Mahahattipadopama Sutta ("The Great Elephant Footprint Simile", MN 28)
- Maharahulovada Sutta ("The Greater Exhortation to Rahula", MN 62)
- Kayagatasati Sutta ("Mindfulness Immersed in the Body", MN 119)
- Dhatu-vibhanga Sutta ("An Analysis of the Properties", MN 140)
- In the Saṃyutta Nikāya's collection regarding the four bases of power (iddhipada), in a sutta called Vibhanga ("Analysis", Saṃyutta Nikāya 51.20)
- Udayi Sutta ("To Udayi", Aṅguttara Nikāya 6.29)
- Girimananda Sutta ("To Girimananda", AN 10.60)

Elsewhere in Pali literature, this type of meditation is discussed extensively in the post-canonical Visuddhimagga (Vism. VIII, 44-145).

In several of these sources, this meditation is identified as one of a variety of meditations on the body along with, for instance, the mindfulness of breathing (see Anapanasati Sutta).

== See also ==
- Ānāpānasati Sutta
- Kāyagatāsati Sutta
- Satipatthana Sutta
- Upajjhatthana Sutta
- Jarāmaraṇa
- Anussati
- Metta
- Buddhist meditation
