= Śāriputrābhidharma =

Buddhist Abhidharma text

The Śāriputrābhidharma-śāstra (Ch. Shèlìfú Āpítán Lùn, 舍利弗阿毘曇論, Taisho: 28, No. 1548, pp. 525c-719a) is a Buddhist Abhidharma text of the Sthāvirāḥ Dharmaguptaka school, the only surviving Abhidharma from that school. It was translated into Chinese in thirty fascicles between 407 and 414 CE by the monks Dharmayasas and Dharmagupta at Ch'ang An.

According to Erich Frauwallner, it contains some of the same doctrinal content and listings that appear in the Vibhaṅga and Dharmaskandha, which is based on an "ancient core" of early Abhidharma.

== Content ==
The Śāriputrābhidharma is divided into five parts:

1. Sapraśnaka
  1. The 12 āyatanāni
  2. The 18 dhatāvah
  3. The 5 skandhāh
  4. The 4 āryasatyāni
  5. The 22 indriyāni
  6. the 7 bodhyaṅgāni
  7. the 3 akuśala-mūlani
  8. the 3 kuśala-mūlani
  9. the 4 mahābhūtāni
  10. the upāsakaha (its 5 samvarāh)
2. Apraśnaka
  1. dhātuḥ
  2. karma
  3. pudgalaḥ (person)
  4. jñānam
  5. the pratītyasamutpādaḥ
  6. the 4 smṛtyupasthānāni
  7. the 4 samyakprahānāni (right abandonment)
  8. the 4 ṛddhipāda
  9. the 4 dhyānāni
  10. mārgaḥ
  11. akusalā dharmāḥ
3. Saṃgraha
  1. Enumeration and explanation of the elements to be discussed (mainly, the list of the Sapraśnaka)
  2. In which skandhāh, dhatāvah, and āyatanāni these elements are contained.
4. Saṃprayoga
  1. Enumeration and explanation of the mental elements to be discussed. Frauwallner states: "the old mātrkā [list] has been wholly abandoned and replaced by a long list of mental elements, and the question dealt with here is with which elements the elements of this list can be connected."
  2. In which skandhāh, dhatāvah, and āyatanāni these elements are contained.
5. Prasthāna
  1. the 10 pratyayāḥ (conditions)
  2. the hetavaḥ (causes)
  3. nāmarūpam (name and form)
  4. the 10 saṃyojanāni
  5. the kāya-, vāk-, and manaścaritam (bodily, vocal and mental acts)
  6. sparśaḥ (sense contact)
  7. cittam (mind)
  8. the 10 akusalāḥ karmapathāḥ (unwholesome karma paths)
  9. the 10 kusalāḥ karmapathāḥ
  10. samādhiḥ
