= Eternal Now (New Age) =

New Age concept of time perception

Eternal Now is a concept of time perception suggested by some proponents of New Age spirituality. Its characteristics vary from increased awareness of the present moment to a broader, more open and holistic perception of one's subjective past and potential variants of future. The concept is consonant with and constitutes an integration and development of a number of approaches to spiritual alertness and totality of perception advocated by various forms of Buddhist philosophy (in particular Zen Buddhism), Shamanic practices, and other philosophical and spiritual directions, both ancient and contemporary.

== Precursors to the New Age usage ==
Prior to the advent of the New Age usage, the expression is used, perhaps in a more rigorous way, by Thomas R. Kelly in his book, "A Testament of Devotion" (see, for example, Ch. 4, "The Eternal Now and Social Concerns") and by Paul Tillich in his collection of sermons, entitled "The Eternal Now" (see sermon 11, "The Eternal Now").

== Related terms ==
Related terms used in various spiritual traditions and meditative practices include: restful alertness, total awareness, perception of here and now, as well as others.

== See also ==
- Mindfulness
- Satipatthana
- Nunc stans - loosely translated "eternal now"
