= Sati (Buddhism) =

Buddhist concept of mindfulness or awareness

Translations of Sati
- English: mindfulness
- Sanskrit: smṛti
- Pali: sati
- Vietnamese: Niệm

Sati (Pali: sati; Sanskrit: स्मृति smṛti), literally "memory" or "retention", commonly translated as mindfulness, "to remember to observe", (Note: To remember to observe: Vimalaramsi (2015, p. 4): "to remember to observe"; Heyward (2025, p. 376): "In Buddhist practice, sati refers to a quality of present-moment awareness and recollection, encompassing both the ability to be fully present and to remember to maintain that presence.") is an essential part of Buddhist practice. It has the related meanings of calling to mind the wholesome dhammas such as the four establishments of mindfulness, the five faculties, the five powers, the seven awakening-factors, the Noble Eightfold Path, and the attainment of insight, and the actual practice of maintaining a lucid awareness of the dhammas of bodily and mental phenomena, in order to counter the arising of unwholesome states, and to develop wholesome states. It is the first factor of the Seven Factors of Enlightenment. "Correct" or "right" mindfulness (Pali: sammā-sati, Sanskrit samyak-smṛti) is the seventh element of the Noble Eightfold Path.

== Definition ==
The Buddhist term translated into English as "mindfulness," "to remember to observe," originates in the Pali term sati and in its Sanskrit counterpart smṛti. According to Robert Sharf, the meaning of these terms has been the topic of extensive debate and discussion. Bhikku Analayo notes that the Sanskrit root of smṛti also conveyed attention, citing Rigveda 10.106.9, where a related form means "give heed". Smṛti originally meant "to remember", "to recollect", "to bear in mind", as in the Vedic tradition of remembering sacred texts. The term sati also means "to remember" the teachings of scriptures. In the Satipațțhāna-sutta the term sati means to maintain awareness of reality, where sense-perceptions are understood to be illusions and thus the true nature of phenomena can be seen. Sharf refers to the Milindapanha, which explains that the arising of sati calls to mind the wholesome dhammas such as the four establishments of mindfulness, the five faculties, the five powers, the seven awakening-factors, the Noble Eightfold Path, and the attainment of insight. According to Rupert Gethin,

[sati] should be understood as what allows awareness of the full range and extent of dhammas; sati is an awareness of things in relation to things, and hence an awareness of their relative value. Applied to the satipațțhānas, presumably what this means is that sati is what causes the practitioner of yoga to "remember" that any feeling he may experience exists in relation to a whole variety or world of feelings that may be skillful or unskillful, with faults or faultless, relatively inferior or refined, dark or pure." (Note: Quotes from Gethin, Rupert M.L. (1992), The Buddhist Path to Awakening: A Study of the Bodhi-Pakkhiȳa Dhammā. BRILL's Indological Library, 7. Leiden and New York: BRILL)

Sharf further notes that this has little to do with "bare attention", the popular contemporary interpretation of sati, "since it entails, among other things, the proper discrimination of the moral valence of phenomena as they arise". According to Vetter, dhyana may have been the original core practice of the Buddha, which aided the maintenance of mindfulness.

== Etymology ==
Translations of Mindfulness
- English: mindfulness, awareness, inspection, recollection, retention
- Sanskrit: smṛti (स्मृति)
- Pali: sati
- Chinese: niàn, 念
- Indonesian: perhatian penuh, kesadaran penuh
- Japanese: 念 (ネン) (Rōmaji: nen)
- Khmer: សតិ (UNGEGN: sate)
- Korean: 념 (RR: nyeom)
- Sinhala: සති
- Tibetan: དྲན་པ (Wylie: dran pa; THL: trenpa/drenpa)
- Thai: สติ (sati)
- Vietnamese: niệm

It originates from the Pali term sati and its Sanskrit counterpart smṛti. From Sanskrit it was translated into trenpa in Tibetan (transliteration: dran pa) and nian 念 in Chinese.

=== Pali ===
In 1881, Thomas William Rhys Davids first translated sati into English mindfulness in sammā-sati "Right Mindfulness; the active, watchful mind". Noting that Daniel John Gogerly (1845) initially rendered sammā-sati as "Correct meditation", Davids explained,

sati is literally 'memory' but is used with reference to the constantly repeated phrase 'mindful and thoughtful' (sato sampajâno); and means that activity of mind and constant presence of mind which is one of the duties most frequently inculcated on the good Buddhist."

Henry Alabaster, in The Wheel of the Law: Buddhism Illustrated From Siamese Sources by the Modern Buddhist, A Life of Buddha, and an Account of the Phrabat (1871), had earlier defined "Satipatthan/Smrityupasthana" as "The act of keeping one's self mindful."

The English term mindfulness already existed before it came to be used in a (western) Buddhist context. It was first recorded as mindfulness in 1530 (John Palsgrave translates French pensee), as mindfulnesse in 1561, and mindfulness in 1817. Morphologically earlier terms include mindful (first recorded in 1340), mindfully (1382), and the obsolete mindiness (ca. 1200).

John D. Dunne, an associate professor at University of Wisconsin-Madison whose current research focuses especially on the concept of "mindfulness" in both theoretical and practical contexts, asserts that the translation of sati and smṛti as mindfulness is confusing and that a number of Buddhist scholars have started trying to establish "retention" as the preferred alternative.

Bhikkhu Bodhi also points to the meaning of "sati" as "memory":

The word derives from a verb, sarati, meaning “to remember,” and occasionally in Pali sati is still explained in a way that connects it with the idea of memory. But when it is used in relation to meditation practice, we have no word in English that precisely captures what it refers to. An early translator cleverly drew upon the word mindfulness, which is not even in my dictionary. This has served its role admirably, but it does not preserve the connection with memory, sometimes needed to make sense of a passage.

In What Does Mindfulness Really Mean? A Canonical Perspective (2011), Bhikkhu Bodhi points out that sati is not only "memory", but also a "lucid awareness of present happenings". (Note: Bhikkhu Bodhi: "But we should not give this [meaning of memory] excessive importance. When devising a terminology that could convey the salient points and practices of his own teaching, the Buddha inevitably had to draw on the vocabulary available to him. To designate the practice that became the main pillar of his meditative system, he chose the word sati. But here sati no longer means memory. Rather, the Buddha assigned the word a new meaning consistent with his own system of psychology and meditation. Thus it would be a fundamental mistake to insist on reading the old meaning of memory into the new context.… I believe it is this aspect of sati that provides the connection between its two primary canonical meanings: as memory and as lucid awareness of present happenings.… In the Pāli suttas, sati has still other roles in relation to meditation but these reinforce its characterization in terms of lucid awareness and vivid presentation.") Also, he quoted the below-mentioned comment by Thomas William Rhys Davids as "remarkable acumen":

But as happened at the rise of Buddhism to so many other expressions in common use, a new connotation was then attached to the word, a connotation that gave a new meaning to it, and renders ‘memory’ a most inadequate and misleading translation.

=== Sanskrit ===
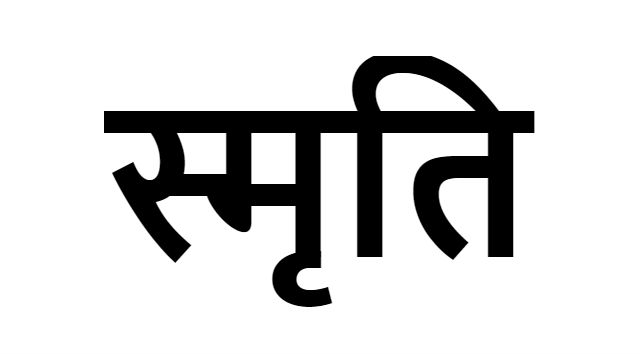
smṛti written in Devanagari script

The Sanskrit word smṛti स्मृति (also transliterated variously as smriti, smRti, or sm'Rti) literally means "that which is remembered", and refers both to "mindfulness" in Buddhism and "a category of metrical texts" in Hinduism, considered second in authority to the Śruti scriptures.

Monier Monier-Williams's Sanskrit-English Dictionary identifies eight meanings of smṛti स्मृति, including "remembrance, reminiscence, thinking of or upon, calling to mind, memory". Other meanings include:

1. memory as one of the Vyabhicāri-bhāvas [transient feelings]; (Note: See also wisdomlib.org, Vyabhicaribhava, which translates smṛti as "recollection".)
2. Memory (personified either as the daughter of Daksha and wife of Aṅgiras or as the daughter of Dharma and Medhā);
3. the whole body of sacred tradition or what is remembered by human teachers (in contradistinction to Śruti or what is directly heard or revealed to the Rishis; in its widest acceptation this use of the term Smṛti includes the 6 Vedangas, the Sūtras both Śrauta and Grhya, the Manusmṛti, the Itihāsas (e.g., the Mahābhārata and Ramayana), the Puranas and the Nītiśāstras, "according to such and such a traditional precept or legal text";
4. the whole body of codes of law as handed down memoriter or by tradition (esp. the codes of Manusmṛti, Yājñavalkya Smṛti and the 16 succeeding inspired lawgivers) … all these lawgivers being held to be inspired and to have based their precepts on the Vedas;

=== Chinese ===
Eastern Zhou dynasty (771-221 BCE) Large Seal Script graph for nian 念

Buddhist scholars translated smṛti with the Chinese word nian 念 "study; read aloud; think of; remember; remind". Nian is commonly used in Modern Standard Chinese words such as guannian 觀念 (观念) "concept; idea", huainian 懷念 (怀念) "cherish the memory of; think of", nianshu 念書 (念书) "read; study", and niantou 念頭 (念头) "thought; idea; intention". Two specialized Buddhist terms are nianfo 念佛 "chant the name of Buddha; pray to Buddha" and nianjing 念經 (念经) "chant/recite sutras".

This Chinese character nian 念 is composed of jin 今 "now; this" and xin 心 "heart; mind". Bernhard Karlgren graphically explains nian meaning "reflect, think; to study, learn by heart, remember; recite, read – to have 今 present to 心 the mind". The Chinese character nian or nien 念 is pronounced as Korean yeom or yŏm 염, Japanese ネン or nen, and Vietnamese niệm.

A Dictionary of Chinese Buddhist Terms gives basic translations of nian: "Recollection, memory; to think on, reflect; repeat, intone; a thought; a moment."

The Digital Dictionary of Buddhism gives more detailed translations of nian "mindfulness, memory":

- Recollection (Skt. smṛti; Tib. dran pa). To recall, remember. That which is remembered. The function of remembering. The operation of the mind of not forgetting an object. Awareness, concentration. Mindfulness of the Buddha, as in Pure Land practice. In Abhidharma-kośa theory, one of the ten omnipresent factors 大地法. In Yogâcāra, one of the five 'object-dependent' mental factors 五別境;
- Settled recollection; (Skt. sthāpana; Tib. gnas pa). To ascertain one's thoughts;
- To think within one's mind (without expressing in speech). To contemplate; meditative wisdom;
- Mind, consciousness;
- A thought; a thought-moment; an instant of thought. (Skt. kṣana);
- Patience, forbearance.

=== Alternate translations ===
The terms sati/smriti have been translated as:

- Attention (Jack Kornfield)
- Awareness
- Concentrated attention (Mahasi Sayadaw)
- Inspection (Herbert Guenther)
- Mindful attention
- Mindfulness
- Recollecting mindfulness (Alexander Berzin)
- Recollection (Erik Pema Kunsang, Buddhadasa Bhikkhu)
- Reflective awareness (Buddhadasa Bhikkhu)
- Remindfulness (James H. Austin)
- Retention
- Self-recollection (Jack Kornfield)

== Practice ==
Originally, mindfulness provided the way to liberation, by paying attention to sensory experience, preventing the arising of disturbing thoughts and emotions which cause the further chain of reactions leading to rebirth. In the later tradition, especially Theravada, mindfulness is an antidote to delusion (Pali: Moha), and is considered as such one of the 'powers' (Pali: bala) that contribute to the attainment of nirvana, in particular when it is coupled with clear comprehension of whatever is taking place. Nirvana is a state of being in which greed, hatred and delusion (Pali: moha) have been overcome and abandoned, and are absent from the mind.

=== Satipaṭṭhāna - guarding the senses ===
The Satipaṭṭhāna Sutta (Sanskrit: Smṛtyupasthāna Sūtra) is an early text dealing with mindfulness. The Theravada Nikayas prescribe that one should establish mindfulness (satipaṭṭhāna) in one's day-to-day life, maintaining as much as possible a calm awareness of the four upassanā: one's body, feelings, mind, and dharmas.

According to Grzegorz Polak, the four upassanā have been misunderstood by the developing Buddhist tradition, including Theravada, as four different foundations rather than as awareness of four different aspects of raising mindfulness:

- the six sense-bases which one needs to be aware of (kāyānupassanā);
- contemplation on vedanās, which arise with the contact between the senses and their objects (vedanānupassanā);
- the altered states of mind to which this practice leads (cittānupassanā);
- the development from the five hindrances to the seven factors of enlightenment (dhammānupassanā).

Rupert Gethin notes that the contemporary Vipassana movement interprets the Satipatthana Sutta as "describing a pure form of insight (vipassanā) meditation" for which samatha (calm) and jhāna are not necessary. Yet, in pre-sectarian Buddhism, the establishment of mindfulness was placed before the practice of the jhanas, and associated with the abandonment of the five hindrances and the entry into the first jhana. (Note: Gethin: "The sutta is often read today as describing a pure form of insight (vipassanā) meditation that bypasses calm (samatha) meditation and the four absorptions (jhāna), as outlined in the description of the Buddhist path found, for example, in the Sāmaññaphala-sutta [...] The earlier tradition, however, seems not to have always read it this way, associating accomplishment in the exercise of establishing mindfulness with abandoning of the five hindrances and the first absorption.")

According to Paul Williams, referring to Erich Frauwallner, mindfulness provided the way to liberation, "constantly watching sensory experience in order to prevent the arising of cravings which would power future experience into rebirths." (Note: Frauwallner, E. (1973), History of Indian Philosophy, trans. V.M. Bedekar, Delhi: Motilal Banarsidass. Two volumes., pp.150 ff) Buddhadasa also argued that mindfulness provides the means to prevent the arising of disturbing thought and emotions, which cause the further chain of reactions leading to rebirth of the ego and selfish thought and behavior.

According to Vetter, dhyana may have been the original core practice of the Buddha, which aided the maintenance of mindfulness.

=== Samprajaña, apramāda and atappa ===
Sati was famously translated as "bare attention" by Nyanaponika Thera. Yet, in Buddhist practice, "mindfulness" is more than just "bare attention"; it has the more comprehensive and active meaning of samprajaña, "clear comprehension," and apramāda, "vigilance". (Note: [I]n Buddhist discourse, there are three terms that together map the field of mindfulness [...] [in their Sanskrit variants] smṛti (Pali: sati), samprajaña (Pali: Sampajañña) and apramāda (Pali: appamada).) All three terms are sometimes (confusingly) translated as "mindfulness", but they all have specific shades of meaning.

In a publicly available correspondence between Bhikkhu Bodhi and B. Alan Wallace, Bodhi has described Ven. Nyanaponika Thera's views on "right mindfulness" and sampajañña as follows:

I should add that Ven. Nyanaponika himself did not regard “bare attention” as capturing the complete significance of satipaṭṭhāna, but as representing only one phase, the initial phase, in the meditative development of right mindfulness. He held that in the proper practice of right mindfulness, sati has to be integrated with sampajañña, clear comprehension, and it is only when these two work together that right mindfulness can fulfill its intended purpose. (Note: According to this correspondence, Ven. Nyanaponika spend his last ten years living with and being cared for by Bodhi. Bodhi refers to Nyanaponika as "my closest kalyāṇamitta in my life as a monk.")

In the Satipaṭṭhāna Sutta, sati and sampajañña are combined with atappa (Pali; Sanskrit: ātapaḥ), or "ardency," (Note: Dictionary.com:adjective: 1. having, expressive of, or characterized by intense feeling; passionate; fervent: an ardent vow; ardent love.; 2. intensely devoted, eager, or enthusiastic; zealous: an ardent theatergoer. an ardent student of French history.; 3. vehement; fierce: They were frightened by his ardent, burning eyes.; 4. burning, fiery, or hot: the ardent core of a star.) and the three together comprise yoniso manasikara (Pali; Sanskrit: yoniśas manaskāraḥ), "appropriate attention" or "wise reflection."

English	Pali	Sanskrit	Chinese	Tibetan
mindfulness/awareness	sati	smṛti स्मृति	念 (niàn)	trenpa (wylie: dran pa)
clear comprehension	sampajañña	samprajñāna संप्रज्ञान	正知力 (zhèng zhī lì)	sheshin (wylie: shes bzhin)
vigilance/heedfulness	appamāda	Apramāda अप्रमाद	不放逸座 (bù fàng yì zuò)	bakyö (wylie: bag yod)
ardency	atappa	Ātapaḥ आतप:	勇猛 (yǒng měng)	nyima (wylie: nyi ma)
attention/engagement	manasikāra	Manaskāraḥ मनस्कारः	如理作意 (rú lǐ zuò yì)	yila jeypa (wylie: yid la byed pa)
foundation of mindfulness	satipaṭṭhāna	Smṛtyupasthānam स्मृत्युपस्थानम्	念住 (niànzhù)	trenpa neybar zagpa (wylie: dran pa nye bar gzhag pa)

=== Anapanasati - mindfulness of breathing ===
Ānāpānasati (Pali; Sanskrit: ānāpānasmṛti; Chinese: 安那般那; Pīnyīn: ānnàbānnà; Sinhala: ආනා පානා සති), meaning "mindfulness of breathing" ("sati" means mindfulness; "ānāpāna" refers to inhalation and exhalation), is a form of Buddhist meditation now common to the Tibetan, Zen, Tiantai, and Theravada schools of Buddhism, as well as western-based mindfulness programs. Anapanasati means to feel the sensations caused by the movements of the breath in the body, as is practiced in the context of mindfulness. According to tradition, Anapanasati was originally taught by the Buddha in several sutras including the Ānāpānasati Sutta. (Note: In the Pali canon, the instructions for anapanasati are presented as either one tetrad (four instructions) or four tetrads (16 instructions). The most famous exposition of four tetrads – after which Theravada countries have a national holiday (see uposatha) – is the Anapanasati Sutta, found in the Majjhima Nikaya (MN), sutta number 118 (for instance, see Thanissaro, 2006). Other discourses which describe the full four tetrads can be found in the Samyutta Nikaya's Anapana-samyutta (Ch. 54), such as SN 54.6 (Thanissaro, 2006a), SN 54.8 (Thanissaro, 2006b) and SN 54.13 (Thanissaro, 1995a). The one-tetrad exposition of anapanasati is found, for instance, in the Kayagata-sati Sutta (MN 119; Thanissaro, 1997), the Maha-satipatthana Sutta (DN 22; Thanissaro, 2000) and the Satipatthana Sutta (MN 10; Thanissaro, 1995b).) (MN 118)

The Āgamas of early Buddhism discuss ten forms of mindfulness. (Note: The Ekottara Āgama has: 1. mindfulness of the Buddha; 2. mindfulness of the Dharma; 3. mindfulness of the Sangha; 4. mindfulness of giving; 5. mindfulness of the heavens; 6. mindfulness of stopping and resting; 7. mindfulness of discipline; 8. mindfulness of breathing; 9. mindfulness of the body; 10. mindfulness of death) According to Nan Huaijin, the Ekottara Āgama emphasizes mindfulness of breathing more than any of the other methods, and provides the most specific teachings on this one form of mindfulness.

=== Vipassanā - discriminating insight ===
Satipatthana, as four foundations of mindfulness, c.q. anapanasati, "mindfulness of breathing," is being employed to attain Vipassanā (Pāli), insight into the true nature of reality as impermanent and anatta, c.q. sunyata, lacking any permanent essence.

In the Theravadin context, this entails insight into the three marks of existence, namely the impermanence of and the unsatisfactoriness of every conditioned thing that exists, and non-self. In Mahayana contexts, it entails insight into what is variously described as sunyata, dharmata, the inseparability of appearance and emptiness (two truths doctrine), clarity and emptiness, or bliss and emptiness.

Vipassanā is commonly used as one of two poles for the categorization of types of Buddhist practice, the other being samatha (Pāli; Sanskrit: śamatha). Though both terms appear in the Sutta Pitaka (Note: AN 4.170 (Pali): “Yo hi koci, āvuso, bhikkhu vā bhikkhunī vā mama santike arahattappattiṁ byākaroti, sabbo so catūhi maggehi, etesaṁ vā aññatarena. Katamehi catūhi? Idha, āvuso, bhikkhu samathapubbaṅgamaṁ vipassanaṁ bhāveti[...] Puna caparaṁ, āvuso, bhikkhu vipassanāpubbaṅgamaṁ samathaṁ bhāveti[...] Puna caparaṁ, āvuso, bhikkhu samathavipassanaṁ yuganaddhaṁ bhāveti[...] Puna caparaṁ, āvuso, bhikkhuno dhammuddhaccaviggahitaṁ mānasaṁ hoti[...] English translation: Friends, whoever — monk or nun — declares the attainment of arahantship in my presence, they all do it by means of one or another of four paths. Which four? There is the case where a monk has developed insight preceded by tranquility. [...] Then there is the case where a monk has developed tranquillity preceded by insight. [...] Then there is the case where a monk has developed tranquillity in tandem with insight. [...] "Then there is the case where a monk's mind has its restlessness concerning the Dhamma [Comm: the corruptions of insight] well under control. AN 2.30 Vijja-bhagiya Sutta, A Share in Clear Knowing: "These two qualities have a share in clear knowing. Which two? Tranquility (samatha) & insight (vipassana). "When tranquility is developed, what purpose does it serve? The mind is developed. And when the mind is developed, what purpose does it serve? Passion is abandoned. "When insight is developed, what purpose does it serve? Discernment is developed. And when discernment is developed, what purpose does it serve? Ignorance is abandoned. "Defiled by passion, the mind is not released. Defiled by ignorance, discernment does not develop. Thus from the fading of passion is there awareness-release. From the fading of ignorance is there discernment-release." SN 43.2 (Pali): "Katamo ca, bhikkhave, asaṅkhatagāmimaggo? Samatho ca vipassanā". English translation: "And what, bhikkhus, is the path leading to the unconditioned? Serenity and insight."), Gombrich and Brooks argue that the distinction as two separate paths originates in the earliest interpretations of the Sutta Pitaka, not in the suttas themselves. (Note: Brooks: "While many commentaries and translations of the Buddha's Discourses claim the Buddha taught two practice paths, one called "shamata" and the other called "vipassanā," there is in fact no place in the suttas where one can definitively claim that.") Vipassana and samatha are described as qualities which contribute to the development of mind (bhāvanā). According to Vetter, Bronkhorst and Gombrich, discriminating insight into transiency as a separate path to liberation was a later development, under pressure of developments in Indian religious thinking, which saw "liberating insight" as essential to liberation. This may also have been due to an over-literal interpretation by later scholastics of the terminology used by the Buddha, and to the problems involved with the practice of dhyana, and the need to develop an easier method. According to Wynne, the Buddha combined meditative stabilisation with mindful awareness and "an insight into the nature of this meditative experience."

Various traditions disagree which techniques belong to which pole. According to the contemporary Theravada orthodoxy, samatha is used as a preparation for vipassanā, pacifying the mind and strengthening the concentration in order to allow the work of insight, which leads to liberation.

Vipassanā-meditation has gained popularity in the west through the modern Buddhist vipassana movement, modeled after Theravāda Buddhism meditation practices, which employs vipassanā and ānāpāna (anapanasati, mindfulness of breathing) meditation as its primary techniques and places emphasis on the teachings of the Satipaṭṭhāna Sutta.

=== Mindfulness (psychology) ===
Mindfulness practice, inherited from the Buddhist tradition, is being employed in psychology to alleviate a variety of mental and physical conditions, including obsessive-compulsive disorder, anxiety, and in the prevention of relapse in depression and drug addiction.

==== "Bare attention" ====
Georges Dreyfus has expressed unease with the definition of mindfulness as "bare attention" or "nonelaborative, nonjudgmental, present-centered awareness", stressing that mindfulness in Buddhist context means also "remembering", which indicates that the function of mindfulness also includes the retention of information. Dreyfus concludes his examination by stating:

[T]he identification of mindfulness with bare attention ignores or, at least, underestimates the cognitive implications of mindfulness, its ability to bring together various aspects of experience so as to lead to the clear comprehension of the nature of mental and bodily states. By over-emphasizing the nonjudgmental nature of mindfulness and arguing that our problems stem from conceptuality, contemporary authors are in danger of leading to a one-sided understanding of mindfulness as a form of therapeutically helpful spacious quietness. I think that it is important not to lose sight that mindfulness is not just a therapeutic technique but is a natural capacity that plays a central role in the cognitive process. It is this aspect that seems to be ignored when mindfulness is reduced to a form of nonjudgmental present-centered form of awareness of one’s experiences.

Robert H. Sharf notes that Buddhist practice is aimed at the attainment of "correct view", not just "bare attention":

Mahasi's technique did not require familiarity with Buddhist doctrine (notably abhidhamma), did not require adherence to strict ethical norms (notably monasticism), and promised astonishingly quick results. This was made possible through interpreting sati as a state of "bare awareness" — the unmediated, non-judgmental perception of things "as they are," uninflected by prior psychological, social, or cultural conditioning. This notion of mindfulness is at variance with premodern Buddhist epistemologies in several respects. Traditional Buddhist practices are oriented more toward acquiring "correct view" and proper ethical discernment, rather than "no view" and a non-judgmental attitude.

Jay L. Garfield, quoting Shantideva and other sources, stresses that mindfulness is constituted by the union of two functions, calling to mind and vigilantly retaining in mind. He demonstrates that there is a direct connection between the practice of mindfulness and the cultivation of morality – at least in the context of Buddhism from which modern interpretations of mindfulness are stemming.

== See also ==
- Buddhism and psychology
- Buddhist meditation
  - Sampajanna
  - Satipatthana
- Dennis Lewis
- Eternal Now (New Age)
- Henepola Gunaratana
- John Garrie
- Mahasati Meditation
- Mahasi Sayadaw
- Metacognition
- Mindfulness (journal)
- Nepsis (Eastern Orthodox Christianity)
- S.N. Goenka
- Samu (Zen)
- Shinzen Young
- Taqwa and dhikr, related Islamic concepts
- Thich Nhat Hanh
- Vipassana

== Sources ==
- Buddhadasa (2014). Heartwood of the Bodhi Tree. Wisdom Publications. ISBN 978-1-61429-152-7.
- Boccio, Frank Jude (2004). Mindfulness yoga: the Awakened Union of Breath, Body and Mind (1st ed.). Boston: Wisdom Publications. ISBN 0-86171-335-4.
- Brahmavamso (2006). Mindfulness, Bliss, and Beyond: A Meditator's Handbook. Boston: Wisdom Publications. ISBN 978-0-86171-275-5.
- Bronkhorst, Johannes (1993), The Two Traditions Of Meditation In Ancient India, Motilal Banarsidass Publ.
- Brooks, Jeffrey S. (2006), A Critique of the Abhidhamma and Visuddhimagga, archived from the original on 2012-08-30
- Gethin, Rupert M.L. (1992), The Buddhist Path to Awakening: A Study of the Bodhi-Pakkhiȳa Dhammā, BRILL
- Gombrich, Richard F. (1997), How Buddhism Began. The Conditioned Genesis of the Early Teachings, New Delhi: Munshiram Manoharlal Publishers Pvt. Ltd.
- Guenther, Herbert V.; Kawamura, Leslie S. (1975). Mind in Buddhist Psychology: A Translation of Ye-shes rgyal-mtshan's "The Necklace of Clear Understanding" (Kindle ed.). Dharma Publishing.
- Gunaratana, Henepola (2011). Mindfulness in Plain English (20th Anniversary ed.). Boston: Wisdom Publications. ISBN 978-0-86171-906-8. Archived from the original on 2013-09-02.
- Hanh, Thich Nhat (1996). The Miracle of Mindfulness: A Manual on Meditation. Beacon Press.
- Heyward, Carolyn (2025). "The History and Theoretical Framework of Mindfulness-Based Stress Reduction (MBSR)". In Wen Li, Wendy; Griffith, Gemma M.; Shapiro, Shauna; Zhu, Zhuohong (eds.). The Palgrave Handbook of Third-Wave Psychotherapies. Palgrave MacMillan.
- Hoopes, Aaron (2007). Zen Yoga: A Path to Enlightenment through Breathing, Movement and Meditation. Kodansha International.
- McMahan, David L. (2008), The Making of Buddhist Modernism, Oxford University Press, ISBN 9780195183276
- Polak, Grzegorz (2011). Reexamining Jhana: Towards a Critical Reconstruction of Early Buddhist Soteriology. UMCS.
- Sharf, Robert (2014). "Mindfulness and Mindlessness in Early Chan" (PDF). Philosophy East and West. 64 (4): 933–964. doi:10.1353/pew.2014.0074. ISSN 0031-8221. S2CID 144208166. Archived (PDF) from the original on 2016-09-13.
- Schumann, Hans Wolfgang (1974), Buddhism: an outline of its teachings and schools, Theosophical Pub. House
- Siegel, Ronald D. (2010). The Mindfulness Solution: Everyday Practices for Everyday Problems. New York: Guilford Press. ISBN 978-1-60623-294-1.
- Vetter, Tilmann (1988). The Ideas and Meditative Practices of Early Buddhism. BRILL.
- Vimalaramsi, Bhante (2015), A Guide to Tranquil Wisdom Insight Meditation, Dhamma Sukha Publishing
- Weiss, Andrew (2004). Beginning Mindfulness: Learning the Way of Awareness. New World Library.
- Williams, Paul; Tribe, Anthony (2000). Buddhist Thought: a Complete Introduction to the Indian Tradition. London: Routledge. ISBN 0-415-20700-2.
