= Sampajañña =

Buddhist concept

Translations of Sampajañña
- English: clear comprehension, clear knowing, fully alert, full awareness, attention, consideration, discrimination, comprehension, circumspection, introspection
- Sanskrit: संप्रजन्य (saṃprajanya)
- Pali: सम्पजञ्ञ (sampajañña)
- Indonesian: pemahaman jernih berkesadaran jernih
- Japanese: 正知 (Rōmaji: Shouchi)
- Khmer: សម្បជញ្ញៈ (Sampachannheak)
- Tibetan: ཤེས་བཞིན་ (Wylie: shes bzhin, THL Phonetic: shé zhin)
- Vietnamese: tỉnh giác

Sampajañña (Pāli; Skt.: saṃprajña, samprajñatā, Tib: shes bzhin), alternatively known as sampajāna, is a term of central importance for meditative practice in all Buddhist traditions. It refers to "The mental process by which one continuously monitors one's own body and mind." It is very often found in the pair 'mindfulness and introspection' or 'mindfulness and clear comprehension) (Pali: Sati sampajañña, Skt.: smṛti saṃprajña).

== Etymology ==
Sampajañña has been variously translated into English as "continuity", "clear comprehension", "clear knowing", "constant thorough understanding of impermanence", "fully alert" or "full awareness", "attention, consideration, discrimination, comprehension, circumspection", and "introspection".

== From the Pali Canon ==
Clear comprehension is most famously invoked by the Buddha in tandem with mindfulness practice in the Satipaṭṭhāna Sutta:

Herein (in this teaching) a monk lives contemplating the body in the body, ardent, clearly comprehending and mindful, having overcome, in this world, covetousness and grief;
he lives contemplating feelings in feelings, ardent, clearly comprehending and mindful, having overcome, in this world, covetousness and grief;
he lives contemplating consciousness in consciousness, ardent, clearly comprehending and mindful, having overcome, in this world, covetousness and grief;
he lives contemplating mental objects in mental objects, ardent, clearly comprehending and mindful, having overcome, in this world, covetousness and grief.

Clear comprehension develops out of mindfulness of breathing (ānāpānasati) and is subsequently present in tandem with mindfulness for all four satipaṭṭhāna-s.

== Canonical commentary ==
While the nikayas do not elaborate on what the Buddha meant by sampajañña, the Pali commentaries analyze it further in terms of four contexts for one's comprehension:

- purpose (Pāli: sātthaka): refraining from activities irrelevant to the path.
- suitability (sappāya): pursuing activities in a dignified and careful manner.
- domain (gocara): maintaining sensory restraint consistent with mindfulness.
- non-delusion (asammoha): seeing the true nature of reality (see three characteristics).

== Contemporary commentary ==
=== Critical to Right Mindfulness' purpose (Nyanaponika) ===
In a correspondence between Bhikkhu Bodhi and B. Alan Wallace, Bhikkhu Bodhi described Ven. Nyanaponika Thera's views on "right mindfulness" and sampajañña as follows,

... I should add that Ven. Nyanaponika himself did not regard "bare attention" as capturing the complete significance of satipaṭṭhāna, but as representing only one phase, the initial phase, in the meditative development of right mindfulness. He held that in the proper practice of right mindfulness, sati has to be integrated with sampajañña, clear comprehension, and it is only when these two work together that right mindfulness can fulfill its intended purpose.

== See also ==
- Asaṃprajanya – non-alertness, non-vigilance, etc.
- Sammprajnata in Patanjali's ashtanga yoga
- Buddhist meditation
- Mindfulness
- Samatha
- Satipaṭṭhāna
- Vipassanā
