= Dharmaskandha =

Dharmaskandha (Sanskrit: धर्मस्कन्ध; Vietnamese: Pháp uẩn) or Dharma-skandha-sastra (धर्मस्कन्ध शास्त्र) is one of the seven Sarvastivada Abhidharma Buddhist scriptures. Dharmaskandha means "collection of dharmas". It was composed by Sariputra (according to the Sanskrit and Tibetan sources) or Maudgalyayana (according to Chinese sources). The Chinese edition was translated by Xuanzang and appears as: T26, No. 1537, 阿毘達磨法蘊足論, 尊者大目乾連造, 三藏法師玄奘奉 詔譯, in 12 fascicles.

It begins with a matrka as a summary of the topics, showing its antiquity, as these were supposedly only assigned by the Buddha himself. It presents 21 subjects, the first 15 of which concern the practice of the spiritual path and the realization of its fruits. The 16th deals with "various issues". Subjects 17 to 20 deal with the enumeration of the ayatanas, dhatus and skandhas as encompassing "all dharmas". The 21st concerns dependent origination.

Frauwallner concludes that the Dharmaskandha is from a period before then split between the Sanskrit and Pāli Abhidharma traditions, based on its correlation with the Pāli Vibhanga. He thus dates it to pre-Ashoka Buddhism. Yin Shun notes it being mentioned in the Mulasarvastivada Vinaya-vyakaraṇa, indicating its early inclusion in the Sarvastivada canon. These two combined, would suggest the Mulasarvastivada having its own canon at quite an early date.

Yin Shun also cites three points for considering this text to be sourced in a pre-sectarian Abhidharma:

- It similar analysis of rupa to the Sariputta Abhidhamma and the Dhammapariyaya (considered to be the oldest Abhidharma texts of any tradition).
- No mention of avijnapti-rupa, as per the Sariputta Abhidhamma.
- The emphasis on the five indriya and five bala, as paramount in the spiritual path.
