= Kankyo Tannier =

French Zen Buddhist nun and author

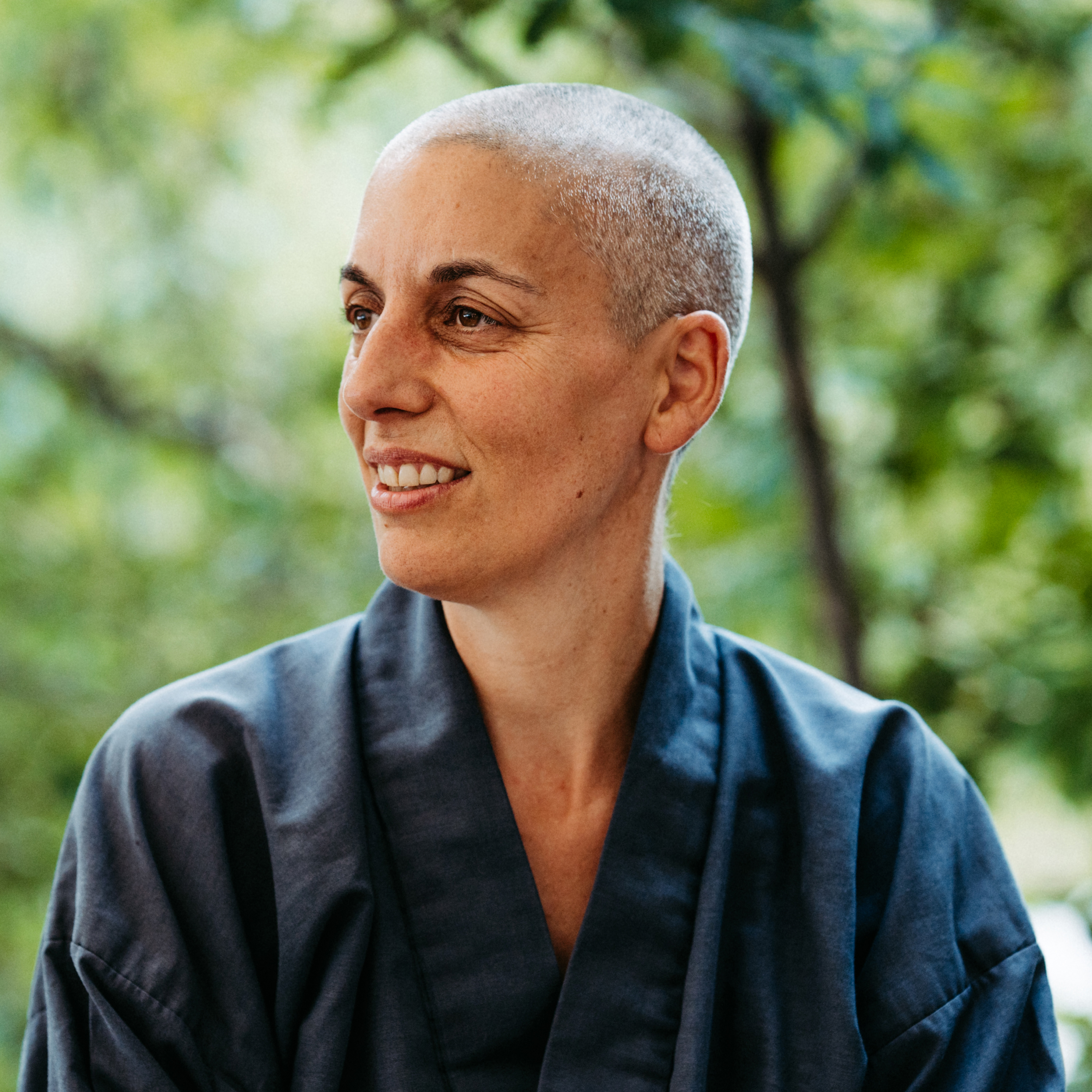
- Kankyo Tannier during a Zen retreat

Personal life
- Born: Isabelle Tannier Lorca; October 19, 1974 (age 51) Paris, France
- Notable work(s): Ma cure de silence (2017); The Gift of Silence (2018)
- Occupation: Zen teacher, Buddhist nun, author
- Website: dailyzen.fr

Religious life
- Religion: Buddhism
- Temple: Tai Kosan Ryūmon Ji
- School: Sōtō Zen
- Lineage: Zen → Sōtō Zen
- Dharma name: Kankyo
- Ordination: 2002

Senior posting
- Teacher: Olivier Wang-Genh
- Based in: Weiterswiller, Alsace, France

Kankyo Tannier (born October 19, 1974, in Paris, France; birth name Isabelle Tannier Lorca) is a French Zen teacher, Buddhist nun, and author associated with the Sōtō Zen school of Zen Buddhism. She is known for teaching meditation practices such as zazen and kinhin and for presenting Zen teachings in a contemporary context through books, lectures, and digital media.

After studying law at the University of Franche-Comté, Tannier entered the Zen monastery Tai Kosan Ryūmon Ji in Weiterswiller, Alsace, in 2001. She was ordained as a Buddhist nun in 2002 by Zen master Olivier Wang-Genh, from whom she later received Dharma transmission (shiho) in 2018, authorizing her to teach within the Sōtō Zen lineage.

Tannier teaches meditation through retreats, public lectures, and online platforms, where she discusses themes such as silence, mindfulness, and the role of meditation in everyday life. Her writings often focus on adapting traditional Zen practices to contemporary conditions, including stress and digital distraction.

Her books on meditation and well-being have been translated into multiple languages. In addition to her teaching activities, she founded the Kibo Animal Sanctuary in 2019 near the Ryūmon Ji temple in Alsace, a project combining Buddhist spirituality, community living, animal protection, and permaculture.

== Early life and education ==
Tannier grew up in a Catholic working-class family in Clichy-sous-Bois, a suburb of Paris. In 1991 she began studying law at the University of Franche-Comté (Université de Franche-Comté). She graduated in 1997 with a master's degree in public law.

During her university years, she also performed as a singer, singing chanson and jazz pieces. Her interest in Buddhism developed after reading a book by the Dalai Lama, which introduced her to meditation and Buddhist philosophy.

== Monastic life ==
In 2001, at the age of 26, Tannier entered the Zen monastery Tai Kosan Ryūmon Ji in Weiterswiller, Alsace. The monastery had been founded in 1999 by Zen master Olivier Wang-Genh.

In 2002 she was ordained as a Buddhist nun in the Sōtō Zen tradition by Wang-Genh and received the Dharma name Kankyo, meaning “observing the mirror of the universe”.

From 2009 to 2012 she served as webmaster of the Union Bouddhiste de France (French Buddhist Union). In 2018 she received Dharma transmission (shiho) from Olivier Wang-Genh, authorizing her to teach within the Sōtō Zen lineage.

== Activities ==
Tannier teaches Zen meditation practices including seated meditation (zazen) and walking meditation (kinhin). Her teachings emphasize silence, mindfulness, and awareness in everyday life.

She has led meditation retreats, workshops, and public talks across Europe. Through blogs, podcasts, and online videos she discusses meditation and spirituality in the context of contemporary life.

Her approach presents Zen meditation as a practice that can be integrated into modern lifestyles while remaining rooted in traditional Buddhist teachings.

=== Kibo Animal Sanctuary ===
In 2019 Tannier founded the Kibo Animal Sanctuary (Japanese: 希望, meaning “hope”) near the Ryūmon Ji temple in Alsace. The project combines Buddhist spirituality, animal welfare, community living, and permaculture.

In the same year she helped establish the Centre Méditation Zen du Luxembourg, where she serves as director and regularly teaches Zen meditation.

== Teachings ==
Tannier emphasizes silence and mindfulness as central aspects of Zen practice. In her writings she encourages practitioners to cultivate moments of quiet reflection in daily life as a way to develop awareness and emotional balance.

Her teaching style adapts traditional Zen practices to modern contexts while maintaining the core principles of meditation, simplicity, and attentiveness.

== Influences ==
Media coverage has described Tannier as part of a generation of Buddhist teachers who present traditional Zen practice through modern forms of communication, including blogs, podcasts, and online videos. Commentators have noted that her approach combines elements of classical Zen training with contemporary discussions about mindfulness and daily life.

Journalists have also highlighted her emphasis on silence and meditation as responses to the pressures of modern society, including stress, constant digital connectivity, and the pace of contemporary lifestyles. According to reports in European media, her work reflects broader efforts by Buddhist teachers to make meditation accessible to a wider public beyond traditional monastic settings.

== Publications ==
=== German ===
- Unterwegs ins Hier & Jetzt. Buddhistische Impulse, um aus jedem Moment das Beste zu machen [À la recherche du temps présent]. München: Lotos Verlag / Penguin Random House. 2019. ISBN 978-3-7787-8290-3.
- Stille. Meine buddhistische Kur für ein leichteres Leben [Ma cure de silence]. München: Arkana Verlag / Penguin Random House. 2018. ISBN 978-3-442-34235-8.

=== French ===
- Danser au milieu du chaos. Secrets zen d'une nonne bouddhiste. Éditions Flammarion. 2021. ISBN 978-2-286-16736-3.

=== English ===
- The Gift of Silence: Finding Peace in a World Full of Noise. Yellow Kite. 2018. ISBN 978-1-4736-7343-4.

=== Spanish ===
- La magia del silencio. Editorial Planeta. 2017. ISBN 978-84-08-17731-9.

=== Italian ===
- La magia del presente. Milano: Sperling & Kupfer. 2019. ISBN 978-88-200-6681-9.

=== Chinese ===
- 静音 : 应对复杂世界的简单方法 [Ma cure de silence]. Beijing: 中信出版集团股份有限公司. 2019. ISBN 978-7-5086-9991-2.

=== Portuguese ===
- A magia do agora. ARENA. 2021. ISBN 978-989-784-182-8.

Her books have been translated into multiple languages including English, German, Spanish, Italian, Chinese, and Portuguese.

== See also ==
- Zen
- Sōtō Zen
- Zazen
- Kinhin
- Buddhist monasticism
- Mindfulness
