= Monkey mind =

Buddhist term

Monkey Mind / Mind Monkey
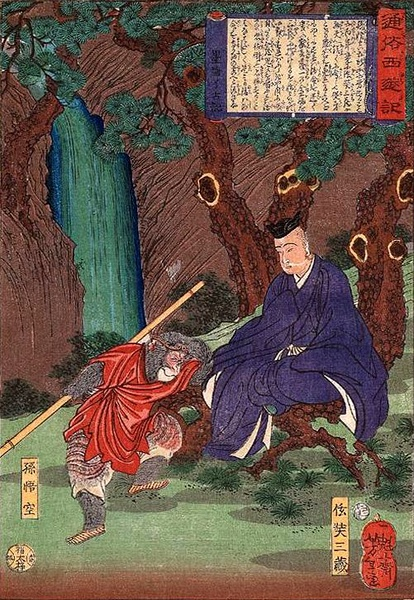
- Illustration of Sun Wukong and Tang Sanzang, 1864 edition Journey to the West

Chinese name
- Chinese: 心猿
Transcriptions
Standard Mandarin
- Hanyu Pinyin: xīnyuán
- Bopomofo: ㄒㄧㄣㄩㄢˊ
- Wade–Giles: hsin^{1}-yüan^{2}
- Yale Romanization: syin1ywan2
Yue: Cantonese
- Jyutping: sam^{1}jyun^{4}
Middle Chinese
- Middle Chinese: simhjwon

Korean name
- Hangul: 심원
- Hanja: 心猿
Transcriptions
- Revised Romanization: simwon
- McCune–Reischauer: simwŏn

Japanese name
- Kanji: 心猿
- Kana: しんえん
Transcriptions
- Revised Hepburn: shin'en
- Kunrei-shiki: sinen

The term monkey mind or mind monkey originates from Chinese xīnyuán or Sino-Japanese shin'en (心猿), a word that literally means "heart-mind monkey." It is a Buddhist concept that describes a state of restlessness, capriciousness, and lack of control in one's thoughts. This "mind monkey" metaphor is not only found in Buddhist writings such as Chan or Zen, Consciousness-only, Pure Land, and Shingon, but it has also been adopted in Taoism, Neo-Confucianism, Chinese poetry, theater, and literature. The expression "monkey mind" commonly appears in two reversible four-character idioms paired with yima or iba (意馬), which means "idea horse": Chinese xinyuanyima (心猿意馬) and Japanese ibashin'en (意馬心猿) illustrate the interconnectedness of a restless mind and wandering thoughts. The "Monkey King" Sun Wukong in the classic Chinese novel Journey to the West is an iconic personification of feeling indecisive and unsettled.

== Linguistic and cultural background ==
"Mind-monkey" (心猿) is an exemplary animal metaphor. Some figures of speech are cross-linguistically common, verging upon linguistic universals; many languages use "monkey" or "ape" words to mean "mimic", for instance, Italian scimmiottare "to mock; to mimic" < scimmia "monkey; ape", Japanese sarumane (猿真似 [lit. "monkey imitation"] "copycat; superficial imitation"), and English monkey see, monkey do or to ape). Other animal metaphors have culture-specific meanings; compare English chickenhearted "cowardly; timid'; easily frightened" and Chinese jixin (雞心 [lit. "chicken heart"] "heart-shaped; cordate").

The four morphological elements of Chinese xinyuanyima or Japanese shin'en'iba are xin or shin (心 "heart; mind"), yi or i (意 "thought"), yuan or en (猿 "monkey"), and ma or ba (馬 "horse").

=== Xin and yi ===
The psychological components of the "mind-monkey will-horse" metaphor are Chinese xin or Sino-Japanese shin or kokoro (心 "heart; mind; feelings, affections; center") and yi or i (意 'thought, idea; opinion, sentiment; will, wish; meaning'). This Chinese character 心 was graphically simplified from an original pictogram of a heart, and 意 ("thought; think") is an ideogram combining 心 under yin (音 "sound; tone; voice") denoting "sound in the mind; thought; idea".

In Chinese Buddhism and Japanese Buddhism, xin/shin (心 "heart; mind") generally translates Sanskrit citta "the mind; state of mind; consciousness" and yi/i (意) translates Sanskrit manas "the mental organ; deliberation". Some Buddhist authors have used 心 and 意 interchangeably for "mind; cognition; thought". Compare these Digital Dictionary of Buddhism glosses

- 心 "Spirit, motive, sense. The mind as the seat of intelligence, mentality, idea. (Skt. citta) … Thought, intellect, feeling; (Skt. mānasa)"
- 意 "Thought, intellect; (Skt. manas; Tib. yid); the mind; (Skt. citta; Tib. sems)".

For example, take the Buddhist word Chinese xin-yi-shi or Japanese shin-i-shiki 心意識 [lit. "mind, thought, and cognition"] that compounds three near-synonyms. Abhey idea-horse"] "distracted; indecisive; restless" is comparable with some other Chinese collocations.

- xinmanyizu 心滿意足 ["heart-full mind-complete"] "perfectly content; fully satisfied"
- xinhuiyilan 心灰意懶 ["heart-ashes mind-sluggish"] "disheartened; discouraged; hopeless" (or xinhuiyileng 心灰意冷 with leng "cold; frosty")
- xinhuangyiluan 心慌意亂 ["heart-flustered mind-disordered"] "alarmed and hysterical; perturbed"
- xinfanyiluan 心煩意亂 ["heart-vexed mind-disordered"] "terribly upset; confused and worried"

=== The "monkey" and "horse" ===
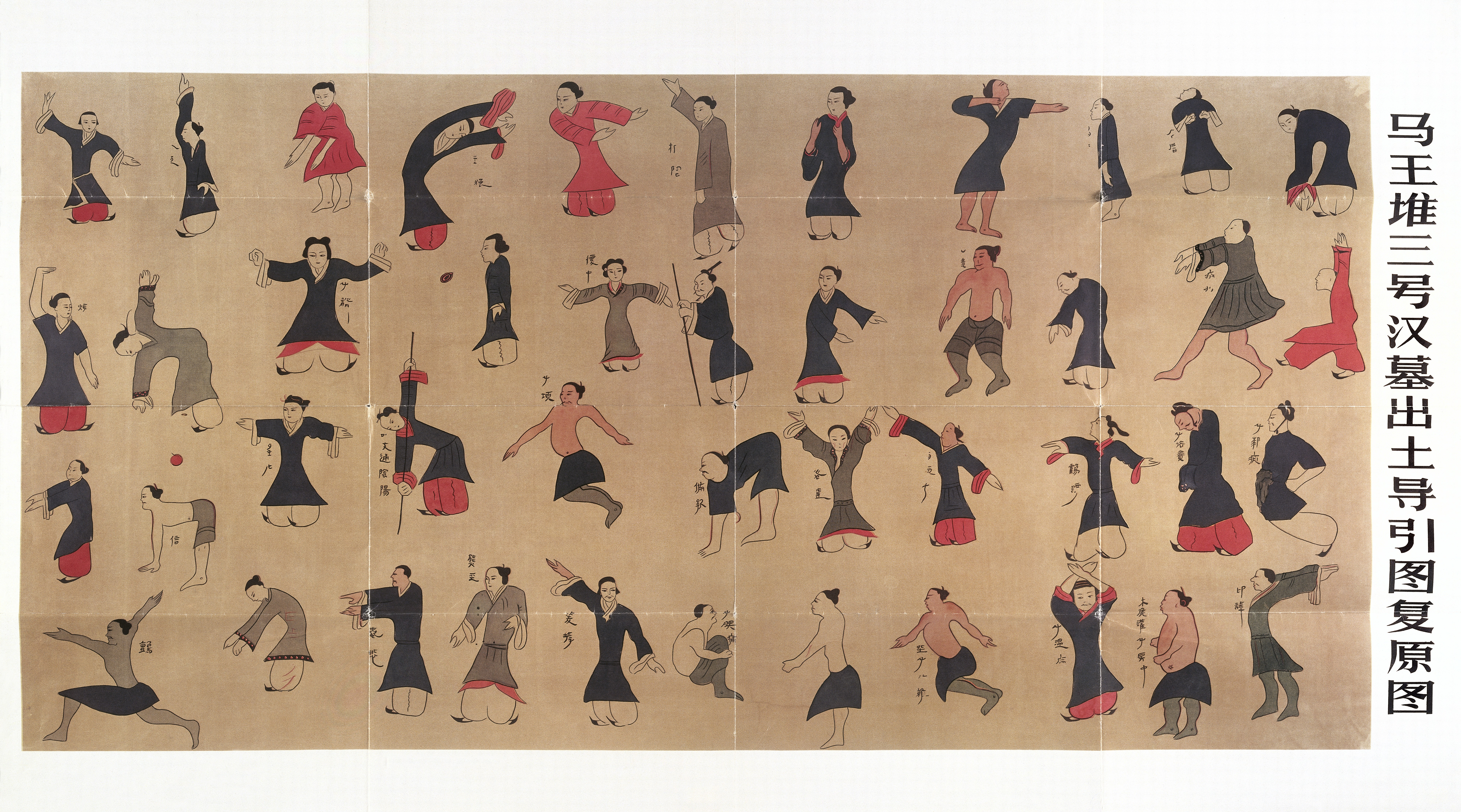
Reconstructed Daoyin tu Drawings of Guiding and Pulling [Qi] in the Mawangdui Silk Texts

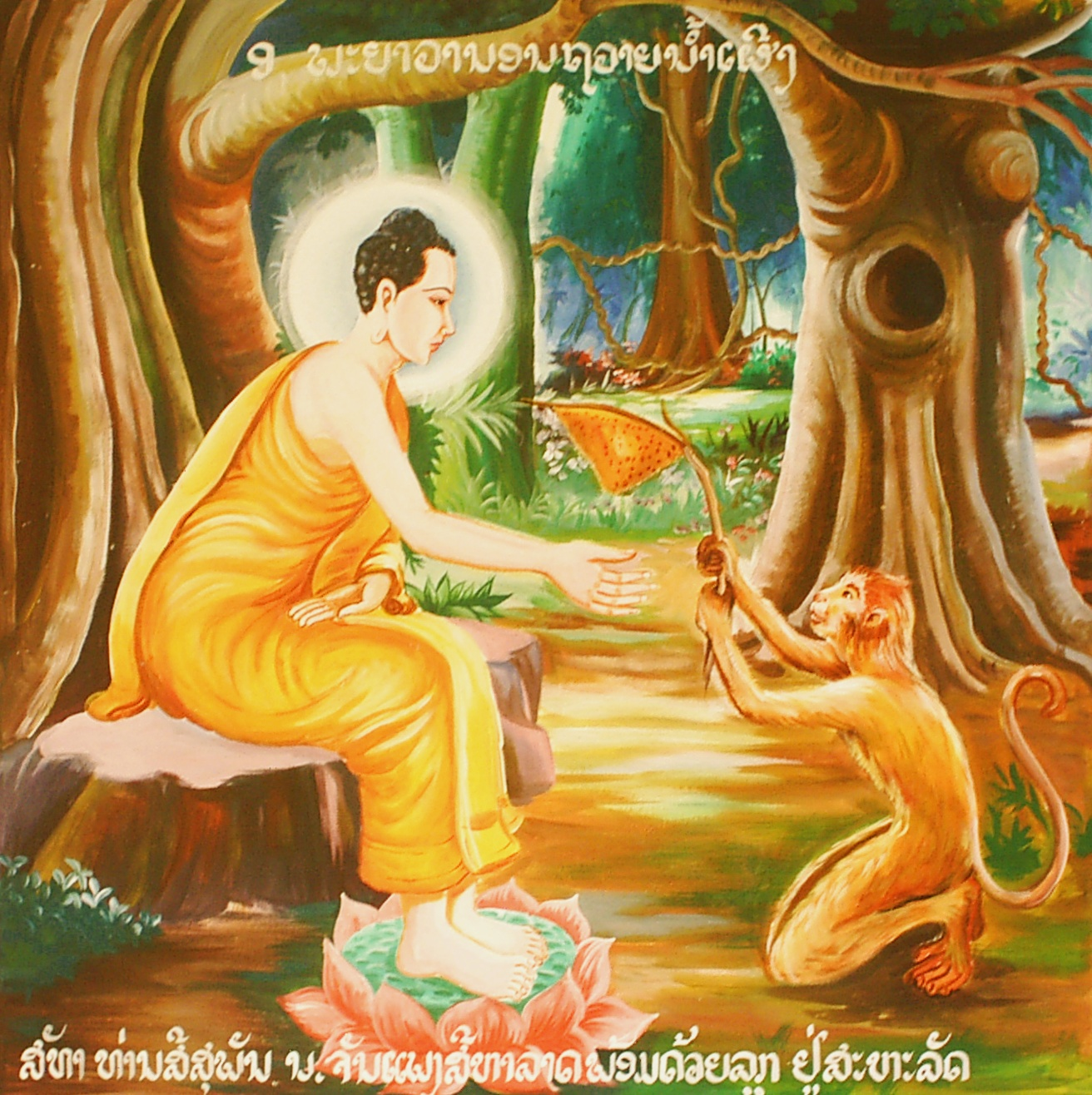
Madhu Purnima Honey-offering Festival commemorating a monkey giving a honeycomb to the Buddha

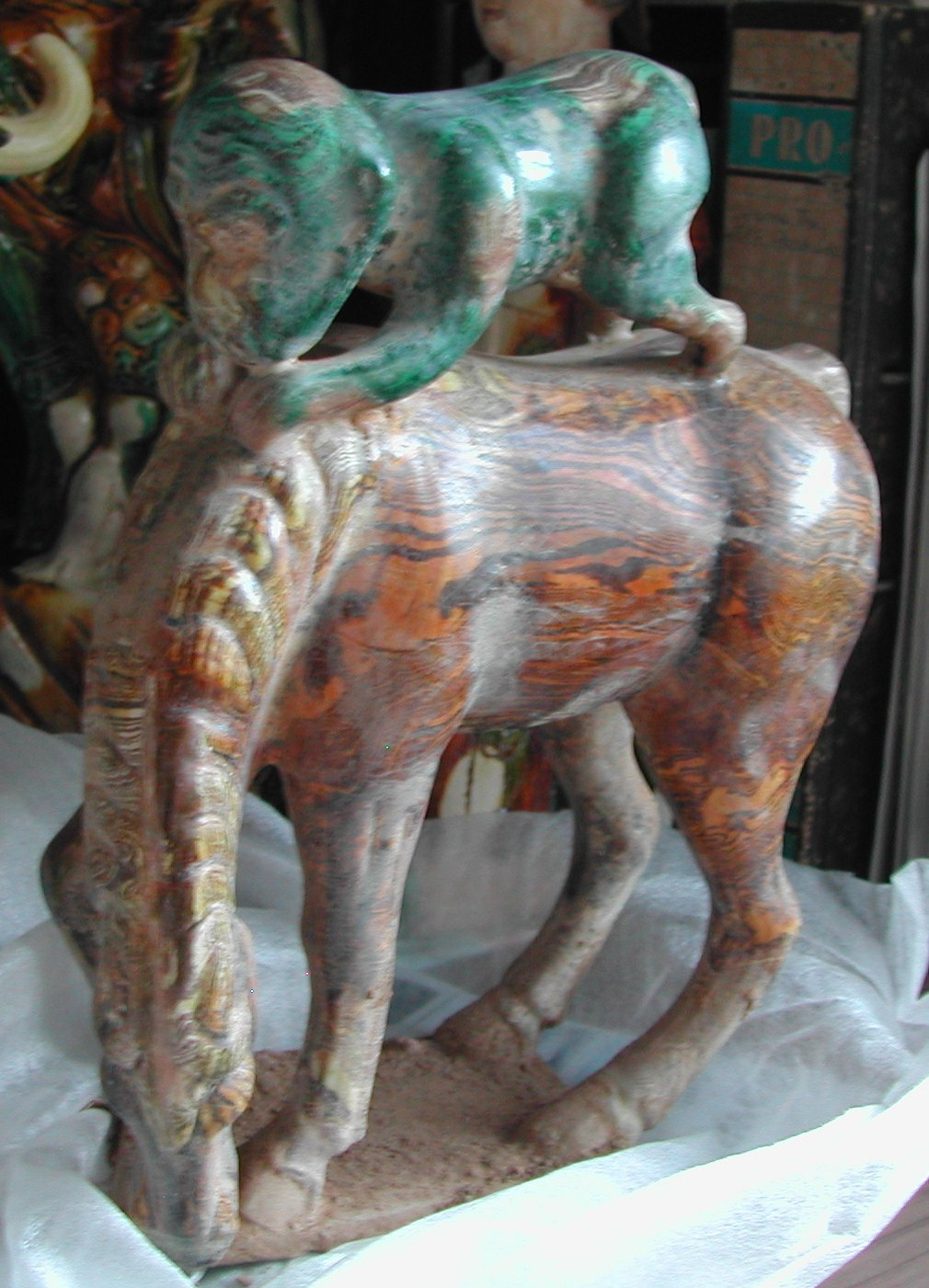
Tri-color glaze porcelain, showing "monkey" (猿) and "horse" (馬). Tang dynasty.

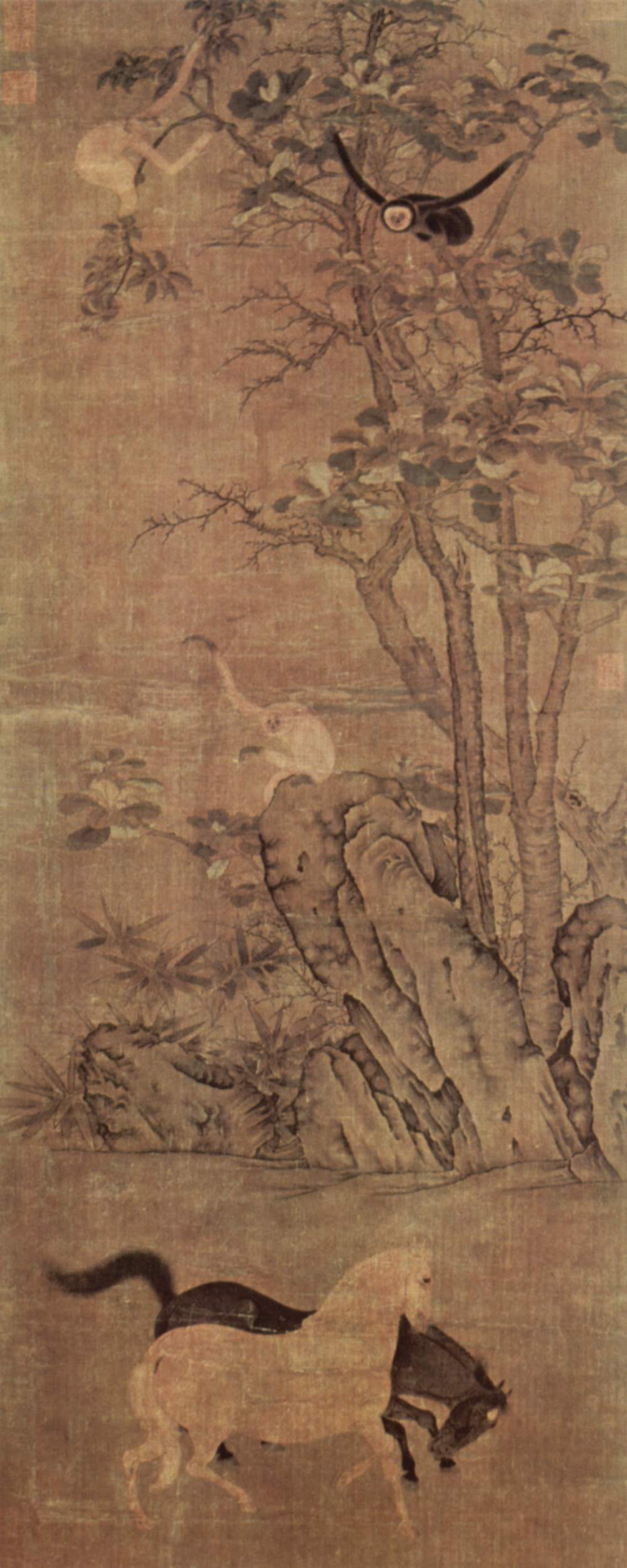
Gibbons and horses, 10th-century Song dynasty painting

The animal components of the "mind-monkey will-horse" metaphor are Chinese yuan or Japanese en ("gibbon; monkey; ape; 猿) and ma or ba ("horse"; 馬).

Chinese yuan (*猿 now 猨 or nao; 猱) originally meant the "agile gibbon, black-handed gibbon, Hylobates agilis" but now generally means "ape; monkey". Robert van Gulik concludes that until about the 14th century, yuan designated the gibbon, but due to extensive deforestation, its habitat shrank to remote southern mountains; from then on, "the majority of Chinese writers knowing about the gibbon only by hearsay, they began to confuse him with the macaque or other Cynopithecoids." Other common Chinese "monkey" names include feifei ("hamadryas baboon"; 狒狒), hou ("monkey; ape"; 猴), and mihou (獼猴 or muhou; 母猴) or husun ("rhesus macaque"; 猢猻), Victor H. Mair reconstructs Old Sinitic *mug-gug, which "probably ultimately derives from the same African word as English 'macaque'" and is reminiscent of Sanskrit "maraṭāsana ('monkey posture')" (see Hanumanasana). These "monkey; ape" characters combine the "dog radical" (犭) with different phonetic elements, such as the yuan (袁) phonetic in yuan (猿).

In Chinese mythology, yuan "gibbons" were supposedly long-lived because they could "absorb life-force" (Chinese: 引氣; pinyin: yinqi; lit. 'pull qi'), which is a daoyin (導引; guiding and pulling) "Daoist gymnastic technique". Chinese classic texts mentioned "monkey leaping" and "monkey bowing" yoga. One of the 2nd-century BCE Mawangdui Silk Texts depicts 28 Daoist gymnastic exercises, many of which are named after animals, including number 22 muhou ("macaque"). In the present day, "Monkey Kung Fu" (猴拳; houquan; 'monkey fist/boxing') is a Chinese martial arts style and xinyuanyima ("mind-monkey will-horse") is a Daoist breath meditation technique.

When one breathes in and out, one's concentration causes the generative force to rise and fall (in the microcosmic orbit) thus slowly turning the wheel of the law. Count from one to ten and then from ten to one hundred breaths with the heart (mind) following the counting to prevent it from wandering outside. When the heart and breathing are in unison, this is called locking up the monkey heart and tying up the running horse of intellect.

The Japanese kanji 猿 is pronounced as Sino-Japanese en < yuan or native saru "monkey", especially the indigenous "Japanese macaque, Macaca fuscata". In Japanese Shinto tradition, the monkey deity Sarutahiko was a divine messenger. Emiko Ohnuki-Tierney contrasts how, "in earlier periods the dominant meaning of the monkey was that of mediator between deities and humans. Later in history, its meaning as a scapegoat became increasingly dominant."

Chinese ma (馬 "horse"), which was the linguistic source for Sino-Japanese ba or ma (馬 "horse"), originally referred to Przewalski's horse and later the Mongolian horse, Ferghana horse, etc. Horses were considered divine animals in both China and Japan. For the Chinese, Edward H. Schafer says,

He was invested with sanctity by ancient tradition, endowed with prodigious qualities, and visibly stamped with the marks of his divine origin. A revered myth proclaimed him a relative of the dragon, akin to the mysterious powers of water. Indeed, all wonderful horses, such as the steed of the pious Hsüan-tsang which, in later legend [see the Xiyouji below], carried the sacred scriptures from India, were avatars of dragons, and in antiquity the tallest horses owned by the Chinese were called simply "dragons."

For the Japanese, the ancient Shinto practice of offering shinme (神馬 "sacred (esp. white) horses") to shrines has evolved into the modern donation of symbolic Shinto ema (絵馬 [lit. "picture horse"] "votive tablets").

Besides the "mind-monkey idea-horse" metaphor, monkeys and horses have further associations. In Chinese astrology, Horse (午; wu) and Monkey (申; shen) are the 7th and 9th of the 12 zodiacal animals. In Chinese animal mythology, monkeys supposedly bring good health to horses. The Bencao Gangmu records the "custom of keeping a female monkey in the horse's stable to ward off sickness (the menstrual discharge of the monkey is said to give immunity to the horse against infectious diseases)".

== Early literary history of "mind-monkeys" ==
This section summarizes Chinese and Japanese developments of "mind-monkey" and "idea-horse" (yima or iba 意馬) collocations and their synonyms. The earliest known textual usages are presented chronologically.

=== Chinese "mind monkey" collocations ===
Chinese authors coined "mind monkey" expressions from the Later Qin dynasty (384-417 CE) through the Song dynasty (960-1279 CE). In modern usage, some terms are considered Classical Chinese, but others like xinyuanyima "mind-monkey will-horse" are Modern Standard Chinese. Unless otherwise noted, translations are by Carr.

Development of Chinese Mind-monkey Terms
Date (CE)	Text	Simplified characters	Traditional characters	Pinyin	Wade-Giles	Literal meaning
c. 406	Weimojiesuoshuojing	心如猿猴	心如猨猴	xīn rú yuánhóu	hsin ju yuan-hou	"mind like a monkey"
c. 540	Mengyu chanhui shi	爱马 ... 心猿	愛馬 ... 心猿	àimǎ … xīnyuán	ai-ma … hsin-yüan	"love-horse … mind-monkey"
657	Daci'ensi sanzang fashizhuan	情猿 ... 意马	情猿 ... 意馬	qíngyuán … yìmǎ	ch'ing-yüan … i-ma	'"feelings-monkey … will-horse"
c. 840	Zengti Du yinju	心猿 ... 意马	心猿 ... 意馬	xīnyuán … yìmǎ	hsin-yüan … i-ma	"mind-monkey … will-horse"
947	Bianwen weimojiejing	心猿意马	心猿意馬	xīnyuányìmǎ	hsin-yüan-i-ma	"mind-monkey will-horse"
c. 1180	Shuixuanshi	意马心猿	意馬心猿	yìmǎxīnyuán	i-ma-hsin-yüan	"will-horse mind-monkey"

The c. 406 Weimojie suoshuo jing (維摩詰所說經) was Kumarajiva's groundbreaking CE Chinese translation of the Vimalakirti Sutra. It introduced "mind-monkey" in the simile xin ru yuanhou (心如猨猴;l= 'heart/mind like a monkey/ape', with yuan 猿's variant Chinese character 猨). "Since the mind of one difficult to convert is like an ape, govern his mind by using certain methods and it can then be broken in". Carr suggests the subsequent line about xiang ma (象馬 "elephants and horses") having unruly natures could have affected the later yima ("idea-horse") term.

The Mengyu chanhui shi (蒙預懺悔詩 "Poem Repenting Foolish Pleasure") is attributed to Emperor Jianwen of Liang (503-550 CE), who was a renowned author. This poem has the oldest known usage of xinyuan ("mind-monkey"), but with (the possibly miscopied) aima (愛馬 "love-horse") instead of yima (意馬 "idea-horse"). "The [三循/修] three disciplines/cultivations expel the [愛馬] love-horse, and the [六意/念] six recollections/ideas still the [心猿] mind-monkey." This Buddhistic poem has numerous graphic variants, including these sanxun (三循 "three disciplines") for sanxiu (三修 "three cultivations"; meditation on impermanence, awareness, and selflessness) and liuyi (六意 "six ideas") for liunian (六念 "six recollections"; mindfulness about Buddha, dharma, sangha, precepts, almsgiving, and heaven). Based on these contextual graphic inconsistencies, Carr suggests the possibility that a scribe transposed Jianwen's original yima (意馬 "idea-horse") as aima (愛馬 "love-horse").

The Daci'ensi sanzang fashizhuan (大慈恩寺三藏法師傳 "Biography of the Tripitaka Dharma Master of the Temple of Great Compassionate Blessings") is a biography of Xuanzang (see the Xiyouji below) written by his disciple Kuiji (the namesake temple in Luoyang, see Emperor Gaozong of Tang). This record of the Consciousness-Only (Yogacara) Buddhism, has a memorial dated 657 CE that parallels yima ("idea-/will-horse") with qingyuan (情猿 "emotion-/feeling-monkey"): "Now if you wish to entrust your thoughts to the Chan sect, you must make your mind as pure as still water, control your emotion-monkey's indolence and fidgeting, and restrain your idea-horse's haste and galloping."

The Tang dynasty poet Xu Hun (fl. 832–844) wrote the first known parallel between "mind-monkey" and "idea-horse." His Zengti Du yinju (贈題杜隱居 "Poem Written for Sir Du the Recluse") says: "Nature exhausts the mind-monkey's hiding, spirit disperses the idea-horse's moving/stopping. Guests who come ought to know this: both self and world are unfeeling."

The common xinyuanyima "mind-monkey will-horse" phrase dates back to a bianwen ("Vernacular Chinese transformation text") narrative version of the Weimojie suoshuo jing (above) that was discovered in the Mogao Caves. This jiangjingwen (講經文 "sutra lecture text") dated 947 CE says: "Within the indeterminable and unfathomable depths, the mind-monkey and idea-horse cease their craziness."

The 1075 CE Wuzhen pian, which is a Daoist classic on Neidan-style internal alchemy, used xinyuan ("mind-monkey") without "horse".

Thoroughly understanding the mind-monkey, the machinations in the heart, by three thousand achievements one becomes a peer of heaven. There naturally is a crucible to cook the dragon and tiger; Why is it necessary to support a household and be attached to spouse and children?

Cleary glosses xinyuan as "the unruly mind, jumping from one object to another."

The Song dynasty poet Zhu Yi (1098–1186 CE) reversed the Tang lyrical xinyuanyima expression into yimaxinyuan ("will-horse mind-monkey"). His Shuixuanshi (睡軒詩 "Sleeping Porch Poem") says: "Haste is useless with the idea-horse and mind-monkey, so take off your baggage someplace deep within dreamland."

The c. 1200 Nan Tang shu (南唐書 "History of the Southern Tang") used the simile yi ru ma xin ru nao (意如馬心如猱 "ideas like a horse and mind like a gibbon/monkey"). Congshan (從善; 939–987), seventh son of the figurehead Emperor Yuanzong of Southern Tang, confesses: "Long ago in my youth, my ideas were like a horse and my mind was like a monkey. I was indolent with happiness and enjoyed lust, was pleased with rewards and forgot toil."

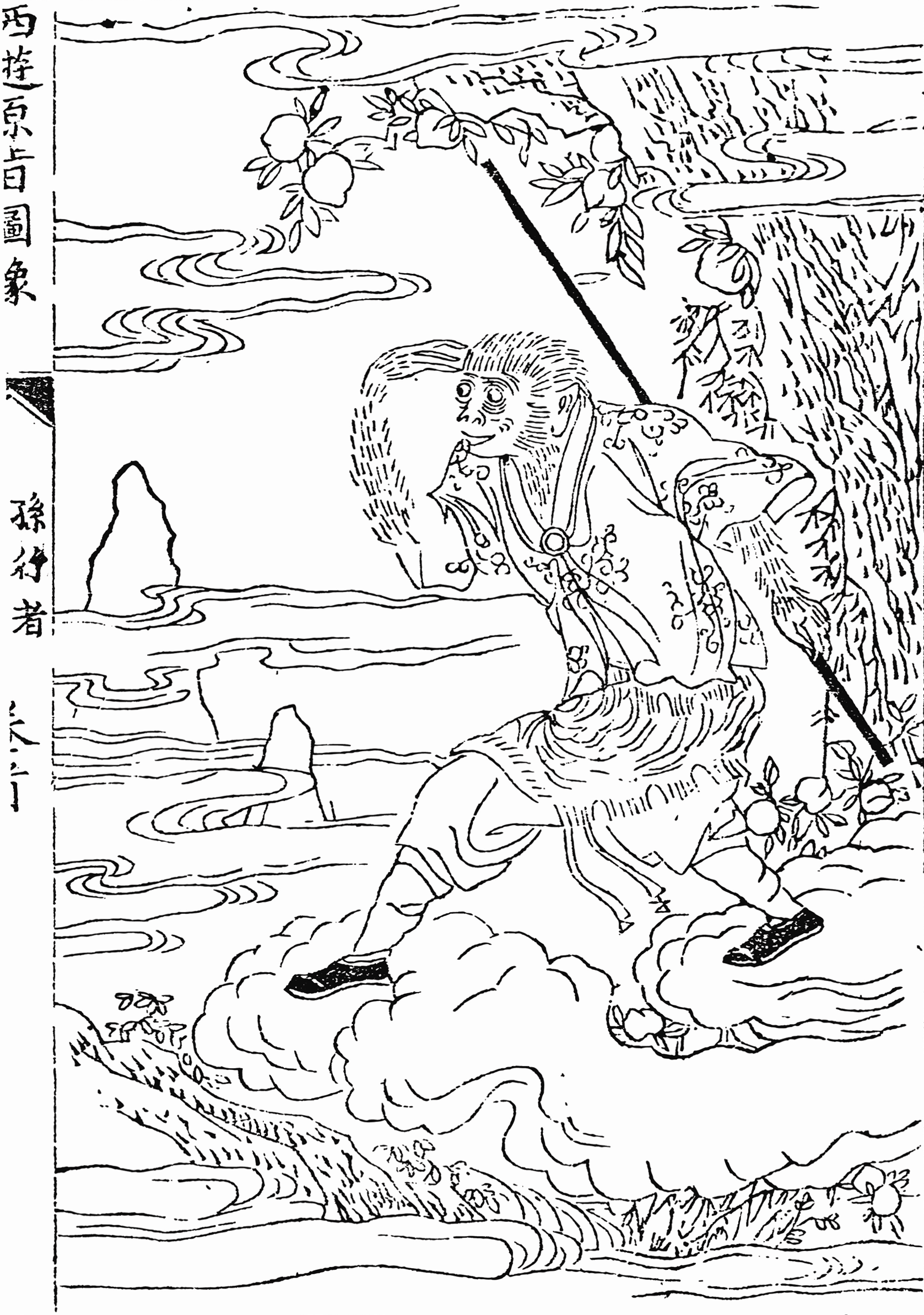
illustration of Sun Wukong

The c. 1590 Journey to the West popularized "mind-monkey" more than any other text. This famous Chinese novel centers upon the pilgrimage of Xuanzang to India, and frequently uses xinyuan and yima expressions. Many are found in the couplet titles of chapters, for instance, 30 "The evil demon attacks the true Dharma; The Horse of the Will recalls the Monkey of the Mind". The preeminent translator Anthony C. Yu describes controlling the mind-monkey and will-horse as "a theme central to the entire narrative and which receives repeated and varied developments." Chapter 7 has this exemplary poem:

A monkey's transformed body weds the human mind. Mind is a monkey – this, the truth profound. The Great Sage [Buddha], Equal to Heaven, is no idle thought. For how could the post of [Bima "Assistant of Horses"] justly show his gifts? The Horse works with the Monkey – and this means both Mind and Will, Must firmly be harnessed and not ruled without. All things return to Nirvāna, taking this one course: In union with Tathāgata [Buddha] to live beneath twin trees.

Many Xiyouji scholars allegorically interpret xinyuan "heart-/mind-monkey" as the protagonist monkey-man Sun Wukong and yima "idea-/will-horse" as the dragon prince White Horse that enters the story in chapter 15. There are long-standing scholarly disagreements over whether Sun Wukong evolved from Hanuman, the monkey hero in the (3rd century BCE) Ramayana. It is "imagistically proper" for Sun to be a monkey, says Mair, because "Zen thought symbolizes the restless and unbridled mind of man as an "ape/monkey-mind"."

=== Japanese "mind-monkey" collocations ===
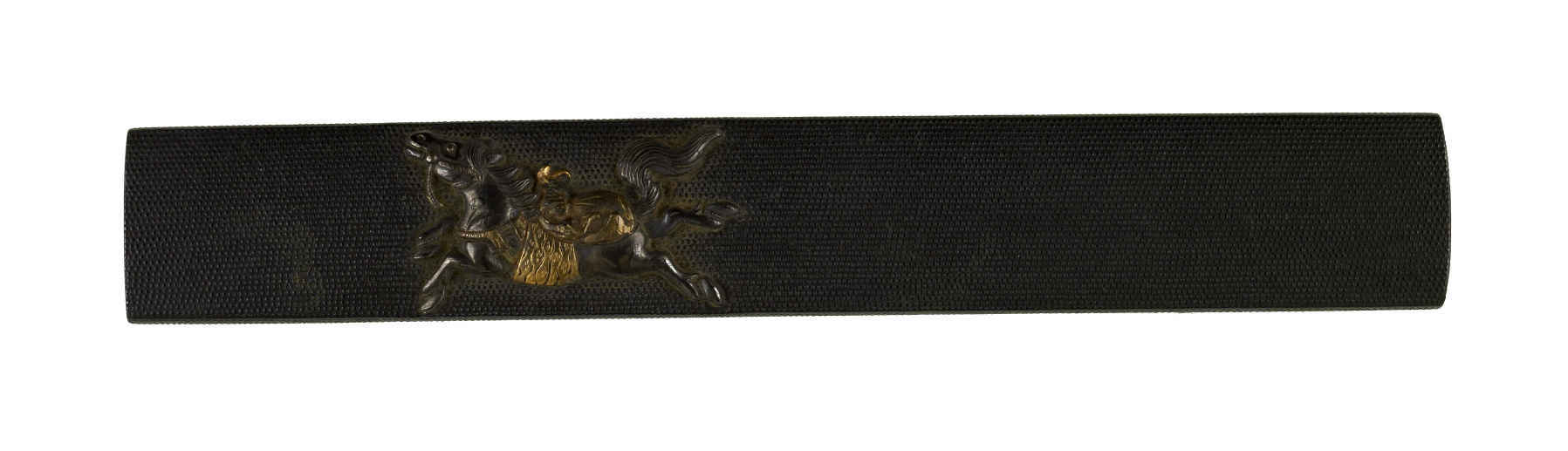
Japanese edged-weapon furniture (kozuka, front) depicting horse and monkey, by smith Aoki Harutsura.

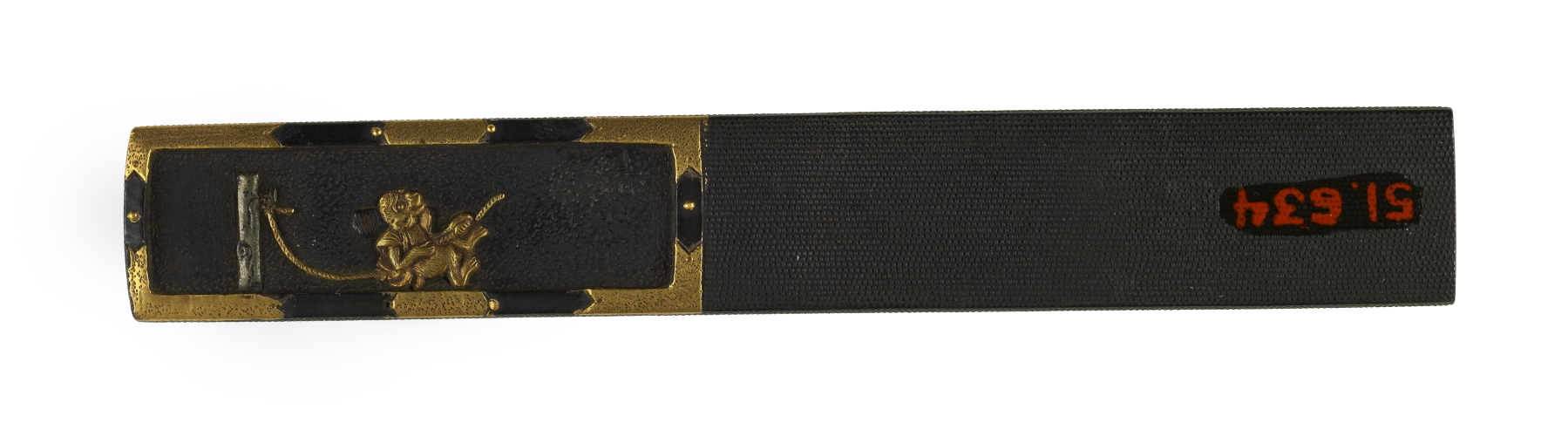
Japanese edged-weapon furniture (kozuka, back) depicting monkey, by smith Aoki Harutsura

Japanese Buddhist monks not only imported Sino-Japanese vocabulary such as shin'en < xinyuan ("mind-monkey") and iba < yima ("idea-horse"), but also invented analogous Japanese words like i'en ("idea-monkey") and shinba ("mind-horse"). Unless otherwise noted, translations are by Carr. The earliest known usages of relevant "mind-monkey" terminology are shown in the table below.

Development of Japanese Mind-monkey Terms
Date (CE)	Text	Kanji	Hepburn	Literal meaning
c. 797	Sangō Shiiki	野馬 ... 意猿	nouma ... i'en	"wild horse … will/intention monkey"
" "	" "	心馬 ... 意車	shinba ... isha	"heart/mind horse" ... "idea/will chariot"
c. 1205	Genkyū hōgo	意馬 ... 心猿	iba ... shin'en	"will/intention horse … heart/mind monkey"
1223	Kaidōki	心船 ... 意馬	shinsen ... iba	"heart/mind boat" ... "will/intention horse"
1675	Man'an kana hōgo	心猿意馬	shin'en'iba	"heart/mind monkey will/intention horse"
1699	Wakoku gosuiten	意馬心猿	ibashin'en	"will/intention horse heart/mind monkey"

During the Heian period (794-1185 CE), the Chinese "mind-monkey" and "idea-horse" were paraphrased as i'en (意猿 "idea-monkey") and shinba (心馬 "mind-horse"). The 797 CE Sangō Shiiki was written by Kūkai, who founded esoteric Shingon Buddhism. Two passages introduced Japanese "mind-monkey" and "will-horse" neologisms. One used i'en with the common word nouma (野馬 "wild horse"): "The four great difficulties overexcite the wild horse's fast gallop, the twenty-six contributory causes mislead the plans of the idea-monkey." Another passage used shinba and isha (意車 "idea-chariot"): "Whip the mind-horse to gallop off in the eight directions, grease the idea chariot and gambol within the nine heavens."

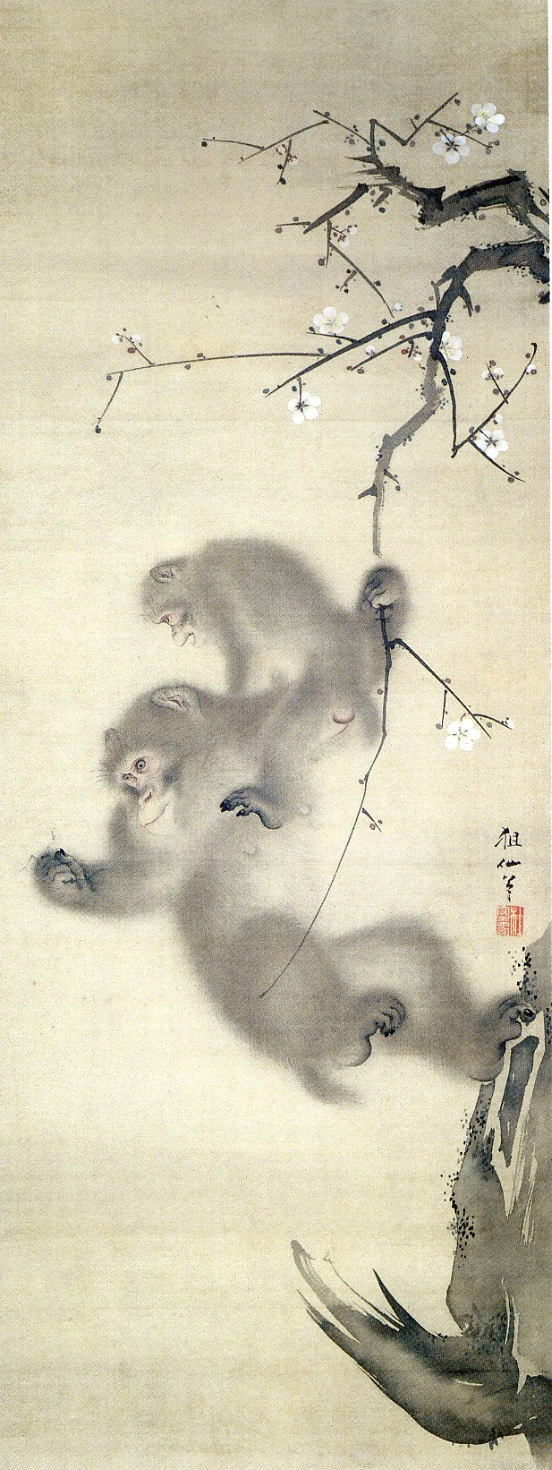
Monkeys in a plum tree by Mori Sosen (1747–1821)

During the Kamakura period (1185–1333 CE), Pure Land Buddhism introduced the Sino-Japanese terms shin'en and iba and an early travelogue popularized them. The Genkyū hōgo 元久法語 "Genkyū era (1204–1206) Buddhist Sermons" is a collection of writings by Hōnen, the founder of the Jōdo Shū. His c. 1205 "Tozanjō 登山状 "Mountain Climbing Description" uses iba with shin'en: "When you wish to enter the gate of determined goodness, then your idea-horse runs wild within the bounds of the six sense objects [rokujin 六塵 < Ayatana: "form, sound, smell, taste, tangibility, and dharma"]. When you wish to enter the gate of scattered goodness, then your mind-monkey gambols and jumps across the branches of the ten evil deeds [jūaku 十悪: killing, stealing, adultery, lying, cursing, slandering, equivocating, coveting, anger, and false views]." The 1223 Kaidōki 海道記 "Record of Coast Road Travels" was a travelogue of the Tōkaidō (road) from Kyoto to Kamakura. It used shinsen 心船 "heart/mind boat" meaning "imaginary journey" with iba 意馬 "idea/will horse" and wrote arasaru 荒猿 "wild monkey" for arasu (荒す "treat roughly/wildly"): "I rowed the mind-boat for make-believe. As yet, I neither poled across myriad leagues of waves on the Coast Road, nor roughly rode the idea-horse to urge it on through clouds of the distant mountain barrier."

During the early Edo period (1603–1868), the four-character Chinese collocations yimashinen (意馬心猿) and shinenyima (心猿意馬) were introduced into Japanese. The 1675 Man'an kana hōgo (卍庵仮名法語), which was a vernacular collection of Zen sermons, first used shin'en'iba (意馬心猿). "For this reason, even if you reside somewhere with remote mountain streams and desolate tranquillity, and sit in silent contemplation, you will only be passing idle time because you are isolated from the road of the mind-monkey and idea-horse." The 1699 Kabuki play Wakoku gosuiten (和国五翠殿 "Japan's Five Green Palaces") repeatedly used ibashin'en. For instance, the first act described two prisoners tied to a tree: "They are the idea-horse and mind-monkey themselves. So if this pine tree is the pole of Absolute Reality, then these two prisoners are a greedy monkey – no, a cat – and a horse running wild; and they are just like the idea-horse and mind-monkey."

== "Mind-monkey" in English ==
"Mind monkey" and "monkey mind" both occur in English usage, originally as translations of xinyuan or shin'en and later as culturally-independent images. Michael Carr concludes,

Xinyuan-yima 心猿意馬 "monkey of the heart/mind and horse of the ideas/will" has been a successful metaphor. What began 1500 years ago as a Buddhist import evolved into a standard Chinese and Japanese literary phrase. Rosenthal says a proverb's success "'depends on certain imponderables," particularly rhythm and phrasing. Of the two animals in this metaphor, the "monkey" phrase was stronger than the "horse" because xinyuan "mind-monkey" was occasionally used alone (e.g., Wuzhenpian) and it had more viable variants (e.g., qingyuan 情猿 "emotion-monkey" in Ci'en zhuan). The "mental-monkey" choice of words aptly reflects restlessness, curiosity, and mimicry associated with this animal. Dudbridge explains how "the random, uncontrollable movements of the monkey symbolise the waywardness of the native human mind before it achieves a composure which only Buddhist discipline can effect."

=== Translations ===
English translations of Chinese xinyuan or Japanese shin'en commonly include "mind monkey", "monkey mind", and "monkey of the mind".

This first list compares how 11 bilingual Chinese dictionaries translate xinyuanyima 心猿意馬 and yimaxinyuan 意馬心猿.

- 【意馬心猿】 his will is like a horse's, and his heart like an ape's; inconstant and strong (A Syllabic Dictionary of the Chinese Language, Williams 1874)
- 【心猿意馬】 gibbon heart and horse ideas, – unsettled and wandering (A Chinese-English Dictionary, Giles 1919)
- 【心猿意馬】 irresolute; vacillating; fluctuating ... Inconstant; fickle in the mind (A Complete Chinese–English Dictionary, Tsang 1920, cf. next)
- 【意馬心猿】 Unsettled in mind; fluctuating; wavering in purpose (A Complete Chinese–English Dictionary)
- 【意馬心猿】The intents of the mind and heart are like the horse and ape – very difficult to bring under control; undecided (Zhonghua Han-Ying dacidian, Lu 1931, cf. next)
- 【心猿意馬】 Restless and unsettled (Zhonghua Han-Ying dacidian)
- 【心猿意馬】 the intents of the mind and heart are like the horse and the ape – very difficult to bring under control; undecided (Mathews' Chinese-English Dictionary, Mathews 1943)
- 【心猿意馬】 cannot make up one's mind; indecision; procrastination (A New Practical Chinese- English Dictionary, Liang 1971)
- 【心猿意馬】 prone to outside attractions, temptations; in a restless and jumpy mood (Lin Yutang's Chinese-English Dictionary of Modern Usage 1972)
- 【心猿意馬】 restless and whimsical; fanciful and fickle; capricious (The Chinese–English Dictionary, Beijing 1979)
- 【心猿意馬】 in a restless and jumpy mood / capricious (A New Chinese–English Dictionary, Ding 1985)
- 【心猿意馬】 restless and whimsical; fanciful and fickle; capricious; when one meant gibbon, he thinks of a horse (A Modern Chinese–English Dictionary, Beijing 1988)
- 【心猿意馬】 ① capricious; restless ② indecisive (ABC Chinese-English Dictionary, DeFrancis 1996, cf. next)
- 【意馬心猿】 indecisive; wavering (ABC Chinese-English Dictionary)

Six of these 11 Chinese–English dictionaries enter only the common xinyuanyima "mind-monkey idea-horse," 2 only the reverse yimaxinyuan, and 3 enter both. Three translation equivalents give English "ape" rather than "gibbon" or "monkey" for yuan 猿, and "ape" sounds metaphorically stronger than "monkey." Note how several of these dictionaries have identical translations.

This second list compares how 9 bilingual Japanese dictionaries translate ibashin'en 意馬心猿, none enters shin'en'iba 心猿意馬.

- 【意馬心猿】 Clamorous demands of passion (Takenobu's Japanese–English Dictionary, Takenobu 1918)
- 【意馬心猿】 overmastering passion (A Standard Japanese–English Dictionary, Takehara 1924)
- 【意馬心猿】Passions hard of control; uncontrollable passions (Saito's Japanese–English Dictionary, Saito 1930)
- 【意馬心猿】Clamorous demands of passion; [uncontrollable] passions (Kenkyusha's New Japanese–English Dictionary, Takenobu 1931)
- 【意馬心猿】 clamorous demands of passion; [uncontrollable] passions; wild horses of passions and flighty monkeys of desires (Kenkyusha's New Japanese–English Dictionary, Katsumata 1954)
- 【意馬心猿】 uncontrollable passions (The Modern Reader's Japanese-English Character Dictionary, Nelson 1974)
- 【意馬心猿】 clamorous demands of passion; (uncontrollable) passions (Kenkyusha's New Japanese–English Dictionary, Masuda 1974)
- 【意馬心猿】 (uncontrollable) passions (Japanese Character Dictionary, Spahn and Hadamitzky 1989)
- 【意馬心猿】 the clamorous demands of passion; (uncontrollable) passions (Kenkyusha's New Japanese–English Dictionary, Watanabe 2003)

All 9 Japanese–English dictionaries mention "passion" or "passions." Note how Saito's "uncontrollable passions" first appeared in 1930 and was copied into 6 other dictionaries. The 5 editions of Kenkyūsha's New Japanese–English Dictionary illustrate lexicographical modifications. Editors copied the "clamorous demands of passion" phrase from the 1st edition (Takenobu's … 1918) into all the subsequent versions. The 2nd (1931) first added "uncontrollable" to "passions," which was copied in later editions. The 3rd edition (1954) included a literal translation "wild horses of passions and flighty monkeys of desires", but this was omitted from the 4th (1974) and 5th (2003, which added the definite article "the").

=== Popular culture ===
Examples of "mind monkey" are predictably common in Chinese popular culture. For instance, Sam yuen yi ma (心猿意馬) – the Cantonese pronunciation of Xinyuanyima ("mind-monkey will-horse") – was a 1999 Hong Kong movie (known in English as "The Accident") by Stanley Kwan. However, examples of "mind monkey" are surprisingly widespread in modern English culture. For instance, there are blogs named "Mind Monkey!", "Mind of the Monkey", "Monkey Mind", and "No monkey mind".

In English-language publishing, fewer books are titled with "mind monkey", such as Master the Mind Monkey, than "monkey mind". "Taming" is common among Taming the Monkey Mind, Taming the Monkey Mind; A Guide to Pure Land Practice, and Taming Our Monkey Mind: Insight, Detachment, Identity. Other examples of book titles include Samba and the Monkey Mind, Meeting the Monkey Halfway, Your Monkey Mind Connection, Still the Monkey, and "Tales For Your Monkey's Mind".

The originally Buddhist "mind monkey" metaphor is also known in popular English-language music. "Mad Melancholy Monkey Mind" is a band. There are albums entitled "Mind Monkey", "Monkey Mind",, "Monkey Mind Control" and Radical Action to Unseat the Hold of Monkey Mind. Song titles include "The Monkey on the Mind" and "Monkey Mind".

== See also ==
- Attention-deficit hyperactivity disorder
- Horse in Chinese mythology
- Monkeys in Chinese culture
- Monkeys in Japanese culture
