= Zazen =

Meditative discipline in Zen Buddhism

Chinese name
- Traditional Chinese: 坐禪
- Simplified Chinese: 坐禅
- Literal meaning: seated meditation
Transcriptions
Standard Mandarin
- Hanyu Pinyin: zuòchán
- Wade–Giles: tso^{4}ch'an^{2}
- IPA: [tswô ʈʂʰǎn]
Hakka
- Pha̍k-fa-sṳ: chhosàm
Yue: Cantonese
- Jyutping: zo^{6}sim^{4}
Southern Min
- Hokkien POJ: chōsiân
Middle Chinese
- Middle Chinese: dzwaHdzyen

Vietnamese name
- Vietnamese alphabet: toạ thiền
- Chữ Hán: 坐禪

Korean name
- Hangul: 좌선
- Hanja: 坐禪
Transcriptions
- Revised Romanization: jwaseon

Japanese name
- Kanji: 坐禅
- Kana: ざぜん
Transcriptions
- Romanization: zazen

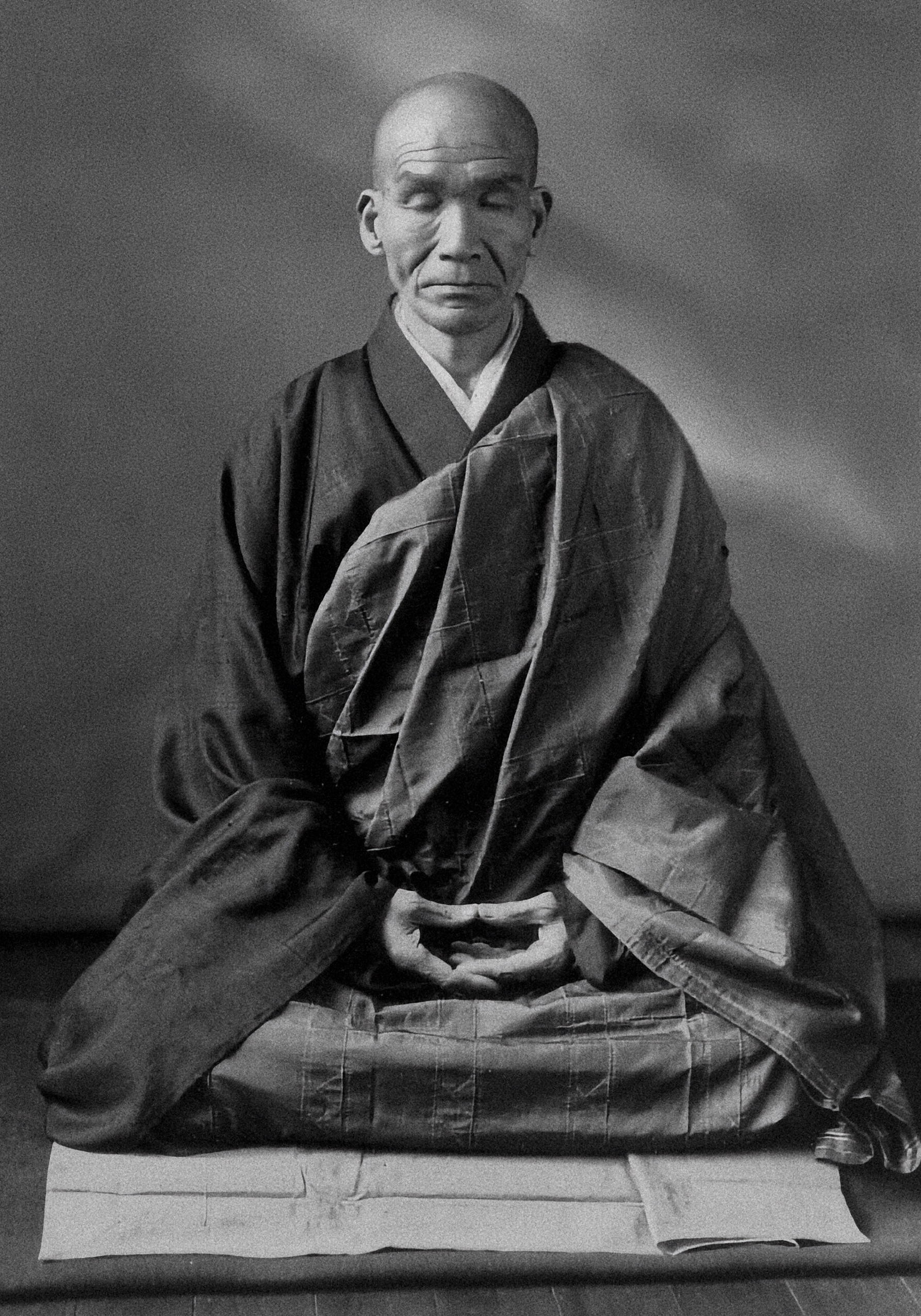
Kodo Sawaki practicing zazen

Zazen is a meditative discipline that is typically the primary practice of the Zen Buddhist tradition.

The generalized Japanese term for meditation is meisō (瞑想); however, zazen has been used informally to include all forms of seated Buddhist meditation. The term zuòchán can be found in early Chinese Buddhist sources, such as the Dhyāna sutras. For example, the famous translator Kumārajīva (344–413) translated a work termed Zuòchán sānmèi jīng (A Manual on the Samādhi of Sitting Meditation) and the Chinese Tiantai master Zhiyi (538–597 CE) wrote some very influential works on sitting meditation.

The meaning and method of zazen varies from school to school, but in general it is a quiet type of Buddhist meditation done in a sitting posture like the lotus position. The practice can be done with various methods, such as following the breath (anapanasati), mentally repeating a phrase (which could be a koan, a mantra, a huatou, or nianfo), or engaging in a kind of open monitoring in which one is aware of whatever comes to our attention (sometimes called shikantaza or silent illumination). Repeating a huatou, a short meditation phrase, is a common method in Chinese Chan and Korean Seon. Meanwhile, nianfo, the practice of silently reciting the Buddha Amitabha's name, is common in the traditions influenced by Pure Land practice, and was also taught by Chan masters like Zongmi.

In the Japanese Buddhist Rinzai school, zazen is usually combined with the study of koans. The Japanese Sōtō school makes less or no use of koans, preferring an approach known as shikantaza where the mind has no intentional focus on any specific object at all.

== Practice ==
=== Five types of Zazen ===
Kapleau quotes Hakuun Yasutani's lectures for beginners. In lecture four, Yasutani lists five kinds of zazen:

- bompu, developing meditative concentration to aid well-being;
- gedo, zazen-like practices from other religious traditions;
- shojo, 'small vehicle' practices;
- daijo, zazen aimed at gaining insight into true nature;
- saijojo, shikantaza.

=== Sitting ===
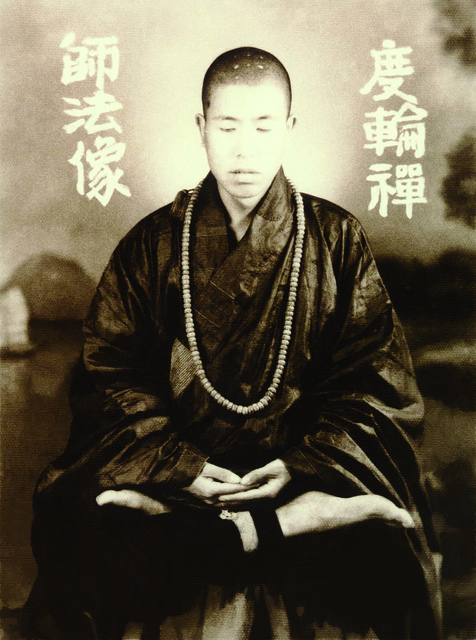
A young master Hsuan Hua sitting in full lotus

In Zen temples and monasteries, practitioners traditionally sit zazen together in a meditation hall usually referred to as a zendo, each sitting on a cushion called a zafu which itself may be placed on a low, flat mat called a zabuton. Practitioners of the Rinzai school sit facing each other with their backs to the wall, while those of the Sōtō school sit facing the wall or a curtain. Before taking one's seat, and after rising at the end of a period of zazen, a Zen practitioner performs a gassho bow to their seat, and a second bow to fellow practitioners. The beginning of a period of zazen is traditionally announced by ringing a bell three times (shijosho), and the end of the period by ringing the bell either once or twice (hozensho). Long periods of zazen may alternate with periods of kinhin (walking meditation).

The identification of Zen with seated meditation has been examined as a feature of modern Buddhism. Robert Sharf has argued that the practice of meditation rarely played a role in Buddhist monastic life and the emphasis on meditative experience in the twentieth century presentations of Zen was rather a recent construction shaped by engagement with western audiences. According to Sharf, while Zen priests in Japan today perform many different rituals and other tasks, zazen is performed on a regular basis only during structured training programs at the main temples.

=== Posture ===
Shunryu Suzuki explains that one sits in the posture of zazen with legs crossed and the spine erect. The hands form the cosmic mudra, with thumbs lightly touching at about the level of the navel. In many practices, the practitioner breathes from the hara (the center of gravity in the belly) and the eyelids are half-lowered, the eyes being neither fully open nor shut so that the practitioner is neither distracted by, nor turning away from, external stimuli.

The legs are folded in one of the standard sitting styles:

- Kekkafuza (full-lotus)
- Hankafuza (half-lotus)
- Burmese (a seated posture in which the ankles are placed in front of the sitter)
- Seiza (a kneeling posture using a bench or zafu)

It is not uncommon for modern practitioners to practice zazen in a chair, sometimes with a wedge or cushion on top of it to create a slight forward incline, or by placing a wedge behind the lower back to help maintain the natural curve of the spine.

=== Samadhi ===
The initial stages of training in zazen may resemble traditional Buddhist samatha meditation. According to some approaches, the student begins by focusing on the breath at the hara/tanden with mindfulness of breath (ānāpānasmṛti) exercises such as counting breath (sūsokukan 数息観) or just watching it (zuisokukan 随息観). (Note: The Japanese Rinzai master Takuan Sōhō was critical of the practice of placing the mind below the navel (at the hara/tanden) in concentration. He said, "...viewed from the highest standpoint of Buddhism, putting the mind just below the navel and not allowing it to wander is a low level of understanding, not a high one. [...] If you consider putting your mind below your navel and not letting it wander, your mind will be taken by the mind that thinks of this plan. You will have no ability to move ahead and will be exceptionally unfree.") Mantras are also sometimes used in place of counting. Practice may be continued in one of these ways until there is adequate "one-pointedness" of mind to constitute an initial experience of samadhi. At this point, the practitioner might move on to koan-practice or shikantaza.

While some teachers such as Dainin Katagiri Roshi taught watching the breath, and Shunryū Suzuki taught counting the breath, others such as Kōshō Uchiyama and Shohaku Okumura taught neither counting nor watching the breath. According to Okumura, one does not put one's focus on the breath (nor any object at all): "We don’t set our mind on any particular object, visualization, mantra, or even our breath itself. When we just sit, our mind is nowhere and everywhere." (Note: Similarly, according to the famous East Asian śāstra, the Awakening of Faith, one does not concentrate on the breath: "Should there be a person who desires to practice “cessation,” he should stay in a quiet place and sit erect in an even temper. [His attention should be focused] neither on breathing nor on any form or color, nor on empty space, earth, water, fire, wind, nor even on what has been seen, heard, remembered, or conceived.")

While Yasutani Roshi states that the development of jōriki (定力) (Sanskrit samādhibala), the power of concentration, is one of the three aims of zazen, Dogen warns that the aim of zazen is not the development of mindless concentration.

==== Koan introspection ====
In the Rinzai school, after having developed awareness, the practitioner can now focus their consciousness on a koan as an object of meditation. While koan practice is generally associated with the Rinzai school and Shikantaza with the Sōtō school, many Zen communities use both methods depending on the teacher and students.

==== Shikantaza ====
Zazen is considered the heart of Japanese Sōtō Zen Buddhist practice. The aim of zazen is just sitting, that is, suspending all judgemental thinking and letting words, ideas, images and thoughts pass by without getting involved in them. Practitioners do not use any specific object of meditation, instead remaining as much as possible in the present moment, aware of and observing what is occurring around them and what is passing through their minds. In his Shobogenzo, Dogen says, "Sitting fixedly, think of not thinking. How do you think of not thinking? Nonthinking. This is the art of zazen."

== See also ==
- Ango – Concept of Japanese Buddhism
- Jing zuo – Meditation practice
- Keisaku – Buddhist ritual implement
- Kinhin – Buddhist meditative practice
- Sesshin – Period of intensive meditation
- Suizen – Wandering medicants recognized by their flute-playing
- Zuowang – Daoist meditation technique
- Vipassana — Meditation of "seeing things as they really are"
