= Xu Hun =

Chinese poet

Xu Hun (traditional Chinese: 許渾; simplified Chinese: 许浑; pinyin: Xǔ Hún; Wade–Giles: Hsü Hun, fl. first half of ninth century) was a Chinese poet. He was poet in the Tang poetry tradition of the Tang dynasty. By passing the rigorous requirements of the imperial examination system, he received his Jinshi degree, in 832, and subsequently followed a "moderately distinguished" professional scholarly career. Xu Hun was descended from Xu Yushi, who was Chancellor under Emperor Gaozong of Tang.

== Poetry ==
Two of Xu Hun's verses are included in the famous poetry anthology Three Hundred Tang Poems, both in the five-character regulated verse form. His work has been compared in style with Li Shangyin and Wen Tingyun.

== See also ==
- Classical Chinese poetry forms
- Mind monkey
- Regulated verse
- Wakan rōeishū
