= Xu Yushi =

Xu Yushi (Chinese: 許圉師; died 679), formally Duke Jian of Ping'en (平恩簡公), was a Chinese politician who served briefly as a chancellor of the Chinese Tang dynasty, during the reign of Emperor Gaozong.

Xu Yushi was a son of Xu Shao (許紹), a Sui dynasty official who, after Tang was founded in 618, submitted to Tang, along with a substantial amount of territory in modern Hubei and Chongqing, and was rewarded for his ability to fend off attacks from two other rebel rulers who also claimed imperial titles—Xiao Xi the Emperor of Liang and Wang Shichong the Emperor of Zheng—and who was greatly praised by Tang's founder Emperor Gaozu for his contributions to Tang's eventual takeover of the entire realm. (In this, Xu Shao was assisted by Xu Yushi's brother-in-law Hao Xianggui (郝相貴), whose son (Xu Yushi's nephew) Hao Chujun later also served as a chancellor.) Xu Yushi was himself described to be capable in literature and arts, and was also said to have been a top finisher in the imperial examination, but not much is known of his early career as an imperial official.

In 659, Xu was promoted to the post of deputy head of the Chancellery, and was also made a de facto chancellor. Late that year, he was made acting Palace Attendant, the head of the Chancellery and a post providing default chancellor status. In 662, he was formally made the head of the Chancellery, although the title, by that point, had been changed to Left Chancellor (左相, zuoxiang) as part of a major reorganization of office titles earlier that year. At some point, for the fact that he participated in editing imperial historical records, he was created the Duke of Ping'en.

Late that year, an incident involving Xu Yushi's son Xu Ziran (許自然) would lead to Xu Yushi's removal. Xu Ziran, who was in charge of imperial wagons, had gone out on a hunt, and during the hunt, he had damaged a farmer's crops. When the farmer became angry, Xu Ziran fired arrows toward the farmer. Xu Yushi caned Xu Ziran 100 times, but did not report this to the emperor. When the farmer submitted a formal accusation, the accusation was initially put aside by the official Yang Deyi (楊德裔), but another official, Yuan Gongyu (袁公瑜), then resubmitted the accusation directly to the emperor under a pseudonym. Emperor Gaozong, in anger, stated, "Xu Yushi is a chancellor, but when the people's lives and properties were interfered with, he did not report to me. Is this not an abuse of power?" Xu responded, "I serve in a key position of the government, and I serve Your Imperial Majesty with honesty and fairness, and I could not please everyone. That is why I am being attacked. As for abusing power, only someone who commands strong troops or is stationed at a key military post can do so. I am but a civilian who serves the emperor, and I only know how to perfect myself behind closed doors. How can I abuse power?" This caused Emperor Gaozong to be angrier, and he stated, "Are you displeased that you do not command troops?" Another chancellor, Xu Jingzong, who happened to be present, stated, "For an imperial subject to have this kind of attitude, death would be too good of a treatment for him!" Emperor Gaozong ordered that Xu Yushi be expelled from his presence and removed from his post.

At a later point, Xu was made the prefect of Qian Prefecture (虔州, roughly modern Ganzhou, Jiangxi), and eventually the prefect of the more important Xiang Prefecture (相州, roughly modern Handan, Hebei). It was said that Xu governed Xiang Prefecture so well that both the people and his subordinates carved stone monuments to praise him. It was also mentioned in history that on one occasion, when one of his subordinates was revealed to have received bribes, he did not punish the subordinate, but rather sent him poems discussing honest officials. The subordinate receiving bribes became ashamed and thereafter served honestly. During Emperor Gaozong's Shangyuan era (674–676), he was recalled to the capital to serve as minister of census.

After his retirement, Xu Yushi's granddaughter married the soon-to-be famous poet Li Bo and one of his descendants was the poet Xu Hun.

Xu Yushi died in 679.
