= Anapanasati =

Mindfulness of breathing, a form of Buddhist meditation

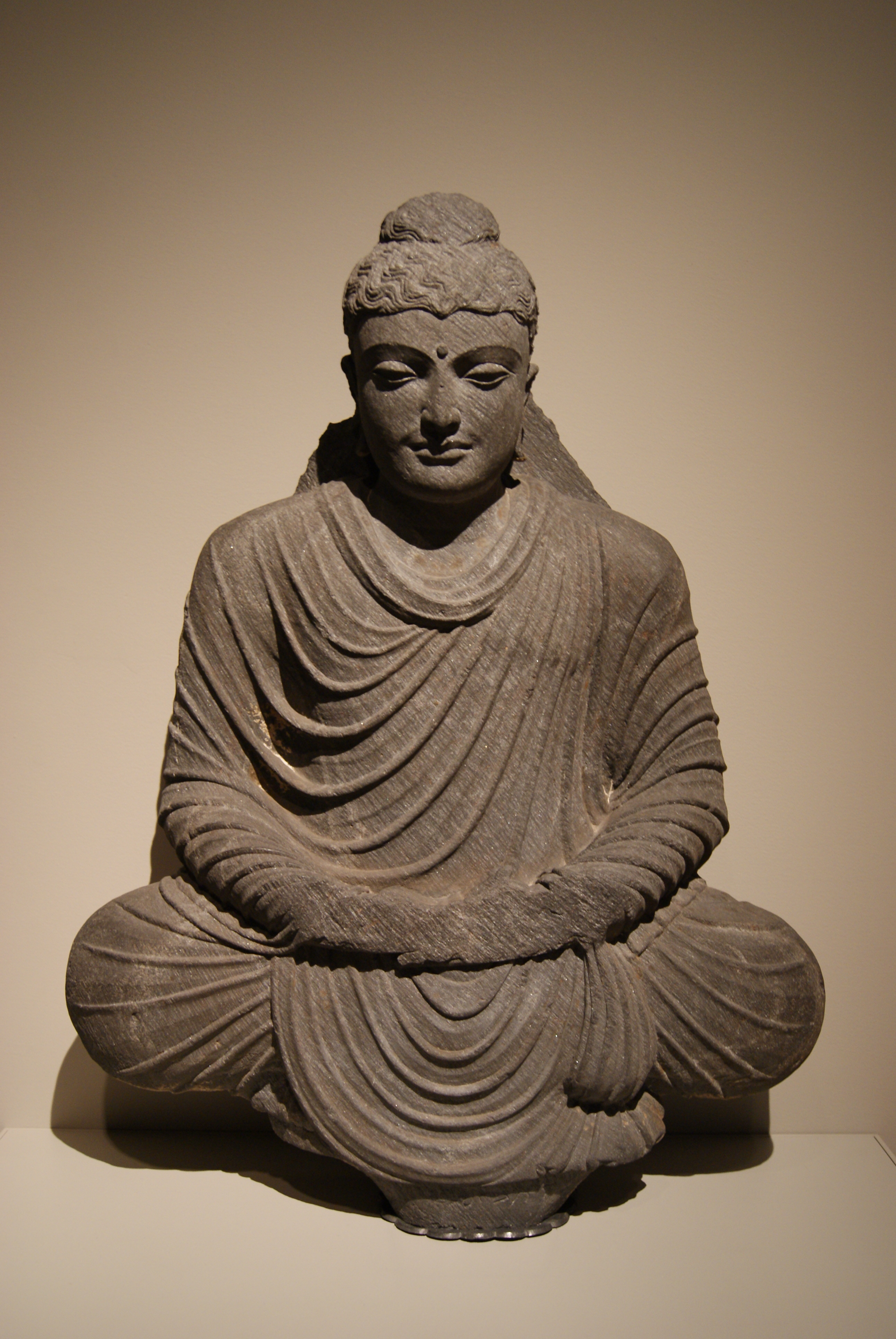
Buddha statue doing anāpānasati

Ānāpānasati (Pali; Sanskrit: ānāpānasmṛti), meaning "mindfulness of breathing" (sati means mindfulness; ānāpāna refers to inhalation and exhalation), is the act of paying attention to the breath. It is the quintessential form of Buddhist meditation, attributed to Gautama Buddha, and described in several suttas, most notably the Ānāpānasati Sutta (MN 118). (Note: In the Pali canon, the instructions for anāpānasati are presented as either one tetrad (four instructions) or four tetrads (16 instructions). The most famous exposition of four tetrads – after which Theravada countries have a national holiday (see uposatha) – is the Ānāpānasati Sutta, found in the Majjhima Nikaya as sutta 118 (for instance, see Thanissaro, 2006). Other discourses which describe the full four tetrads can be found in the Samyutta Nikaya's Anapana-samyutta (Ch. 54), such as SN 54.6 (Thanissaro, 2006a), SN 54.8 (Thanissaro, 2006b) and SN 54.13 (Thanissaro, 1995a). The one-tetrad exposition of anapanasati is found, for instance, in the Kayagata-sati Sutta (MN 119; Thanissaro, 1997), the Maha-satipatthana Sutta (DN 22; Thanissaro, 2000) and the Satipatthana Sutta (MN 10; Thanissaro, 1995b).)

Derivations of anāpānasati are common to Theravada, Tibetan, Zen, and Tiantai Buddhism as well as Western-based mindfulness programs.

== Contemplation of bodily phenomena ==
The Ānāpānasati Sutta prescribes mindfulness of inhalation and exhalation as an element of mindfulness of the body, and recommends the practice of mindfulness of breathing as a means of cultivating the seven factors of awakening, which is an alternative formulation or description of the process of dhyana: sati (mindfulness), dhamma vicaya (analysis), viriya (persistence), pīti (rapture), passaddhi (serenity), samadhi (unification of mind), and upekkhā (equanimity). According to this and other suttas, the development of these factors leads to release (Pali: vimutti; Sanskrit: mokṣa) from dukkha (suffering) and the attainment of nirvana.

Derivations of anāpānasati are a core meditation practice in Theravada, Tiantai, and Chan traditions of Buddhism as well as a part of Western-based mindfulness programs. According to Anālayo, in both ancient and modern times anāpānasati by itself is likely the most widely used Buddhist method for contemplating bodily phenomena.

== The practice ==
=== Ānāpānasati Sutta ===
The mindfulness practice described in the Ānāpānasati Sutta is to go into the forest and sit beneath a tree and then to simply watch the breath:

Breathing in long, he discerns, 'I am breathing in long'; or breathing out long, he discerns, 'I am breathing out long.' Or breathing in short, he discerns, 'I am breathing in short'; or breathing out short, he discerns, 'I am breathing out short.' He trains himself, 'I will breathe in sensitive to the entire body.' He trains himself, 'I will breathe out sensitive to the entire body.' He trains himself, 'I will breathe in calming bodily fabrication.' He trains himself, 'I will breathe out calming bodily fabrication.'

While inhaling and exhaling, the meditator practises:

- training the mind to be sensitive to one or more of: the entire body, rapture, pleasure, the mind itself, and mental processes;
- training the mind to be focused on one or more of inconstancy, dispassion, cessation, and relinquishment;
- steadying, satisfying, or releasing the mind.

If this practice is pursued and well developed, it is said by the Buddha to bring great benefit, aiding the development of mindfulness as one of the factors of awakening:

On whatever occasion the monk remains focused on the body in & of itself — ardent, alert, & mindful — putting aside greed & distress with reference to the world, on that occasion his mindfulness is steady & without lapse. When his mindfulness is steady & without lapse, then mindfulness as a factor for awakening becomes aroused. He develops it, and for him it goes to the culmination of its development.

=== Post-canonical development ===
A popular post-canonical method still used today, follows four stages:

1. repeatedly counting exhalations in cycles of 10
2. repeatedly counting inhalations in cycles of 10
3. focusing on the breath without counting
4. focusing only on the spot where the breath enters and leaves the nostrils (i.e., the nostril and upper lip area) (Note: This use of counting methods is not found in the Pali Canon and is attributed to Buddhaghosa in his Visuddhimagga. According to the Visuddhimagga, counting the breath (gaṇanā) is a preliminary technique, sensitizing one to the breath's arising and ceasing, to be abandoned once one has consistent mindful connection (anubandhanā) with in- and out-breaths (Vism VIII, 195–196). Sustained breath-counting can be soporific or cause thought proliferation (see, e.g., Anālayo 2006, p. 133, n. 68).)

Counting the breath is attributed by the Theravada tradition to Buddhaghosa's Visuddhimagga, but Vasubandhu's Abhidharmakośakārikā also teaches the counting of breaths to ten. The dhyāna sutras, based on Sarvastivada practices and translated into Chinese by An Shigao, also recommend counting the breath, and form the basis of Zen practices. In the dhyana sutras this is organized into a teaching called "the six aspects" or "the six means":

The practice starts with "counting" (ganana), which consists in counting breathing from one to ten. When this is accomplished without any counting failure (dosha), the practitioner advances to the second step, i.e., "pursuing" (anugama), which means intently following the inhalation as it enters the body and moves from the throat, through the heart, the navel, the kidneys, the thighs to the toes and then the reverse movement of the exhalation until it leaves the body. Next comes "concentration" (sthapana) which denotes focusing one's attention on some part of the body from the tip of the nose to the big toe. In the fourth step, called "observation" (upalaksana), the practitioner discerns that the air breathed in and out as well as form (rupa), mind (citta), and mental functions (caitta) ultimately consists of the four great elements. He thus analyzes all the five aggregates. Next follows "the turning away" (vivarta) which consists of changing the object of observation from the air breathed in and out to "the wholesome roots" of purity (kusalamula) and ultimately to "the highest mundane dharma". The last step is called "purification" (parisuddhi) and it marks entering the stage of "realization of the Way", which in Abhidharma literature denotes the stage of "the stream entry" (Sotāpanna) that will inevitably lead the adept to Nirvana in no more than seven lives.

=== Modern sources ===
Traditional anāpānasati teaches to observe inhalation and exhalation by focusing on the air coming in and out the nostrils, but followers of the Burmese Vipassana movement instead recommend focusing on the abdomen's movement during the act of breathing. Other Buddhist schools also teach that as an alternative point of focus.

According to John Dunne, for the practice to be successful, one should dedicate to the practice, and set out the goal of the meditation session. According to Philip Kapleau, in Zen practice one may decide to either practice anāpānasati while seated or standing or lying down or walking, or while alternating seated, standing, lying down, and walking meditation. Then one may concentrate on the breath going through one's nose: the pressure in the nostrils on each inhalation, and the feeling of the breath moving along the upper lip on each exhalation. Other times practitioners are advised to attend to the breath at the tanden, a point slightly below the navel and beneath the surface of the body. Practitioners may choose to count each inhalation, "1, 2, 3,..." and so on, up to 10, and then begin from 1 again. Alternatively people sometimes also count the exhalation: "1, 2, 3,...", on both the inhalation and exhalation. If the count is lost then one should start again from the beginning.

The type of practice recommended in The Three Pillars of Zen is for one to count "1, 2, 3,..." on the inhalation for a while, then to eventually switch to counting on the exhalation, then eventually, once one has more consistent success in keeping track of the count, to begin to pay attention to the breath without counting. There are practitioners who count the breath all their lives as well. Beginning students are often advised to keep a brief daily practice of around 10 or 15 minutes a day. Also, a teacher or guide of some sort is often considered to be essential in Buddhist practice, as well as the sangha, or community of Buddhists, for support.

When one becomes distracted from the breath, which happens to both beginning and adept practitioners, either by a thought or something else, then one simply returns one's attention back to the breath. Philippe Goldin has said that important "learning" occurs at the moment when practitioners turn their attention back to the object of focus, the breath.

=== Active breathing, passive breathing ===
Ānāpānasati is most commonly practiced with attention centered on the breath, without any effort to change the breathing.

In the throat singing practiced by some Buddhist monks in Tibet and Mongolia, the long and slow exhalation during chanting is the core of the practice. The sound of the chant also serves to focus the mind in one-pointed concentration (samadhi), while the sense of self dissolves as awareness becomes absorbed in a realm of pure sound.

In some Japanese Zen meditation, the emphasis is upon maintaining "strength in the abdominal area" (Chinese: dantian; Japanese: tanden) and slow deep breathing during the long outbreath, again to assist the attainment of a mental state of one-pointed concentration. There is also a "bamboo method", during which time one inhales and exhales in punctuated bits, as if running one's hand along the stalk of a bamboo tree.

=== Scientifically demonstrated benefits ===
The practice of focusing one's attention changes the brain in ways to improve that ability over time; the brain grows in response to meditation. Meditation can be thought of as mental training, similar to learning to ride a bike or play the piano.

Meditators experienced in focused attention meditation (of which ānāpānasati is one type) showed a decrease in habitual responding in a 20-minute Stroop test, which, as suggested by Richard Davidson and colleagues, may illustrate a lessening of emotionally reactive and automatic responding behavior. It has been scientifically demonstrated that ānāpānasati enhances connectivity in the brain.

== In the Theravada tradition ==
=== The sixteen steps ===
The Ānāpānasati Sutta (MN 118) sets out sixteen steps of breath meditation arranged in four tetrads (groups of four), each corresponding to one of the four establishments of mindfulness: the body, feelings, the mind, and mental qualities (dhamma). The first two tetrads each culminate in calming a "fabrication" (saṅkhāra). In the first, this is the breath itself, which the Cūḷavedalla Sutta (MN 44) classes as bodily fabrication (kāyasaṅkhāra). In the second, it is perception and feeling, which the same discourse classes as mental fabrication (cittasaṅkhāra). The later Visuddhimagga of Buddhaghosa also describes sixteen ways of approaching the practice.

The sixteen steps of ānāpānasati in MN 118
| Satipaṭṭhāna | Ānāpānasati | Tetrads |
|---|---|---|
| 1. Contemplation of the body | 1. Breathing long (knowing the breath) | First tetrad |
| | 2. Breathing short (knowing the breath) | First tetrad |
| | 3. Experiencing the whole body | First tetrad |
| | 4. Calming bodily fabrication | First tetrad |
| 2. Contemplation of feelings | 5. Experiencing rapture | Second tetrad |
| | 6. Experiencing pleasure | Second tetrad |
| | 7. Experiencing mental fabrication | Second tetrad |
| | 8. Calming mental fabrication | Second tetrad |
| 3. Contemplation of the mind | 9. Experiencing the mind | Third tetrad |
| | 10. Gladdening the mind | Third tetrad |
| | 11. Steadying the mind | Third tetrad |
| | 12. Releasing the mind | Third tetrad |
| 4. Contemplation of mental qualities | 13. Contemplating impermanence | Fourth tetrad |
| | 14. Contemplating dispassion | Fourth tetrad |
| | 15. Contemplating cessation | Fourth tetrad |
| | 16. Contemplating relinquishment | Fourth tetrad |

=== Contemporary interpretations ===
The Ānāpānasati Sutta states that mindfulness of breathing, when developed and pursued, brings the four establishments of mindfulness to completion; these bring the seven factors of awakening to completion, and these in turn bring clear knowing and release to completion.

The Burmese teacher Webu Sayadaw taught ānāpānasati, calling it "a shortcut to Nibbana" that "anyone can use" and "the straight path to Nibbana". He told his disciples that they did not need to know all sixteen ways described in the Visuddhimagga, only the reality of the in-and-out breath.

Anapanasati can also be practised with other traditional meditation subjects, including the four frames of reference (Note: In his translator's introduction to DN 22, Thanissaro (2000) writes: At first glance, the four frames of reference for satipatthana practice sound like four different meditation exercises, but MN 118 [the Anapanasati Sutta] makes clear that they can all center on a single practice: keeping the breath in mind. When the mind is with the breath, all four frames of reference are right there. The difference lies simply in the subtlety of one's focus.... [A]s a meditator gets more skilled in staying with the breath, the practice of satipatthana gives greater sensitivity in peeling away ever more subtle layers of participation in the present moment until nothing is left standing in the way of total release.) and mettā bhāvanā. (Note: According to Kamalashila (2004), one may practice anapanasati with an attitude of mettā bhāvanā in order to prevent (for some practitioners) a kind of dissociation or untoward disconnection from the world.)

== In the Chinese tradition ==
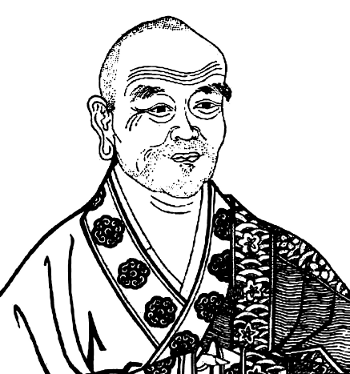
Buddhacinga, a monk who came to China and widely propagated ānāpānasmṛti methods.

In the second century, the Buddhist monk An Shigao came to China and became one of the first translators of Buddhist scriptures into Chinese. He translated a version of the Ānāpānasmṛti Sūtra between 148 and 170 CE. Though once believed to have been lost, the original translation was rediscovered at Amanosan Kongō-ji, Osaka, Japan, by Professor Ochiai Toshinori in 1999. Its commentary, on the other hand, is a significantly longer text than what appears in the Ekottara Āgama, and is entitled, "The Great Ānāpānasmṛti Sūtra" (Ch. 大安般守意經) (Taishō Tripiṭaka 602).

At a later date, Buddhacinga, more commonly known as Fotudeng (佛圖澄) (231–349 CE), came from Central Asia to China in 310 and propagated Buddhism widely. He is said to have demonstrated many spiritual powers, and was able to convert the warlords in this region of China over to Buddhism. He is well known for teaching methods of meditation, and especially ānāpānasmṛti. Fotudeng widely taught ānāpānasmṛti through methods of counting breaths, so as to temper the breathing, simultaneously focusing the mind into a state of peaceful meditative concentration. By teaching meditation methods as well as doctrine, Fotudeng popularized Buddhism quickly. According to Nan Huaijin, "Besides all its theoretical accounts of emptiness and existence, Buddhism also offered methods for genuine realization of spiritual powers and meditative concentration that could be relied upon. This is the reason that Buddhism began to develop so vigorously in China with Fotudeng."

As more monks such as Kumārajīva, Dharmanandi, Gautama Saṃghadeva, and Buddhabhadra came to the East, translations of meditation texts did as well, which often taught various methods of ānāpānasmṛti that were being used in India. These became integrated in various Buddhist traditions, as well as into non-Buddhist traditions such as Daoism.

In the sixth century, the Tiantai school was formed, teaching the One Vehicle (Sanskrit: Ekayāna), the vehicle of attaining Buddhahood, as the main principle, and three forms of śamatha-vipaśyanā correlated with the meditative perspectives of emptiness, provisional existence, and the mean, as the method of cultivating realization. The Tiantai school places emphasis on ānāpānasmṛti in accordance with the principles of śamatha and vipaśyanā. In China, the Tiantai understanding of meditation has had the reputation of being the most systematic and comprehensive of all. The founder of the Tiantai school, Zhiyi, wrote many commentaries and treatises on meditation. Of these texts, Zhiyi's Concise Śamatha-vipaśyanā (Chinese: 小止觀; pinyin: Xiǎo Zhǐguān), his Mahāśamatha Vipaśyanā (摩訶止觀; Móhē Zhǐguān), and his Six Subtle Dharma Gates (六妙法門; Liù Miào Fǎmén) are the most widely read in China. Zhiyi classifies breathing into four main categories: panting (喘; chuǎn), unhurried breathing (風; fēng), deep and quiet breathing (氣; qì), and stillness or rest (息; xī). Zhiyi holds that the first three kinds of breathing are incorrect, while the fourth is correct, and that the breathing should reach stillness and rest. Venerable Hsuan Hua, who taught Chan and Pure Land Buddhism, also taught that the external breathing reaches a state of stillness in correct meditation:

A practitioner with sufficient skill does not breathe externally. That external breathing has stopped, but the internal breathing functions. With internal breathing there is no exhalation through the nose or mouth, but all pores on the body are breathing. A person who is breathing internally appears to be dead, but actually he has not died. He does not breathe externally, but the internal breathing has come alive.

== In the Indo-Tibetan tradition ==
In the Tibetan Buddhist lineage, ānāpānasmṛti is done to calm the mind in order to prepare one for various other practices.

Two of the most important Mahāyāna philosophers, Asaṅga and Vasubandhu, in the Śrāvakabhūmi chapters of the Yogācārabhūmi-śāstra and the Abhidharma-kośa, respectively, make it clear that they consider ānāpānasmṛti a profound practice leading to vipaśyanā (in accordance with the teachings of the Buddha in the Sutta Piṭaka). However, as scholar Leah Zahler has demonstrated, "the practice traditions related to Vasubandhu's or Asaṅga's presentations of breath meditation were probably not transmitted to Tibet." Asaṅga correlates the sixteen stages of ānāpānasmṛti with the four smṛtyupasthānas in the same way that the Ānāpānasmṛti Sūtra does, but because he does not make this explicit the point was lost on later Tibetan commentators.

As a result, the largest Tibetan lineage, the Gelug, came to view ānāpānasmṛti as a mere preparatory practice useful for settling the mind but nothing more. Zahler writes:

The practice tradition suggested by the Treasury itself--and also by Asaṅga's Grounds of Hearers--is one in which mindfulness of breathing becomes a basis for inductive reasoning on such topics as the five aggregates; as a result of such inductive reasoning, the meditator progresses through the Hearer paths of preparation, seeing, and meditation. It seems at least possible that both Vasubandhu and Asaṅga presented their respective versions of such a method, analogous to but different from modern Theravāda insight meditation, and that Gelukpa scholars were unable to reconstruct it in the absence of a practice tradition because of the great difference between this type of inductive meditative reasoning based on observation and the types of meditative reasoning using consequences (thal 'gyur, prasaanga) or syllogisms (sbyor ba, prayoga) with which Gelukpas were familiar. Thus, although Gelukpa scholars give detailed interpretations of the systems of breath meditation set forth in Vasubandu's and Asaṅga's texts, they may not fully account for the higher stages of breath meditation set forth in those texts. . . it appears that neither the Gelukpa textbook writers nor modern scholars such as Lati Rinpoche and Gendun Lodro were in a position to conclude that the first moment of the fifth stage of Vasubandhu's system of breath meditation coincides with the attainment of special insight and that, therefore, the first four stages must be a method for cultivating special insight.

Zahler continues,

[I]t appears . .that a meditative tradition consisting of analysis based on observation—inductive reasoning within meditation—was not transmitted to Tibet; what Gelukpa writers call analytical meditation is syllogistic reasoning within meditation. Thus, Jamyang Shaypa fails to recognize the possibility of an 'analytical meditation' based on observation, even when he cites passages on breath meditation from Vasubandhu's Treasury of Manifest Knowledge and, especially, Asaṅga's Grounds of Hearers that appear to describe it.

Stephen Batchelor, who for years was a monk in the Gelukpa lineage, experienced this firsthand. He writes, "such systematic practice of mindfulness was not preserved in the Tibetan traditions. The Gelugpa lamas know about such methods and can point to long descriptions of mindfulness in their Abhidharma works, but the living application of the practice has largely been lost. (Only in dzog-chen, with the idea of 'awareness' [rig pa] do we find something similar.) For many Tibetans the very term 'mindfulness' (sati in Pali, rendered in Tibetan by dran pa) has come to be understood almost exclusively as 'memory' or 'recollection'."

As Batchelor noted, however, in other traditions, particularly the Kagyu and Nyingma, mindfulness based on ānāpānasmṛti practice is considered to be quite profound means of calming the mind to prepare it for the higher practices of Dzogchen and Mahamudra. For the Kagyupa, in the context of mahāmudrā, ānāpānasmṛti is thought to be the ideal way for the meditator to transition into taking the mind itself as the object of meditation and generating vipaśyanā on that basis. The prominent contemporary Kagyu/Nyingma master Chogyam Trungpa, echoing the Kagyu Mahāmudrā view, wrote, "your breathing is the closest you can come to a picture of your mind. It is the portrait of your mind in some sense... The traditional recommendation in the lineage of meditators that developed in the Kagyu-Nyingma tradition is based on the idea of mixing mind and breath." The Gelukpa allow that it is possible to take the mind itself as the object of meditation, however, Zahler reports, the Gelukpa discourage it with "what seems to be thinly disguised sectarian polemics against the Nyingma Great Completeness [Dzogchen] and Kagyu Great Seal [mahāmudrā] meditations."

In the Pañcakrama tantric tradition ascribed to (the Vajrayana) Nagarjuna, ānāpānasmṛti counting breaths is said to be sufficient to provoke an experience of vipaśyanā (although it occurs in the context of "formal tantric practice of the completion stage in highest yogatantra").

== See also ==
- Anussati
- Buddhanussati
- Buddhist meditation
- Jarāmaraṇa
- Patikulamanasikara
- Samatha-vipassana
- Xingqi (circulating breath)
- Zazen
