= Weiterswiller =

- Commune
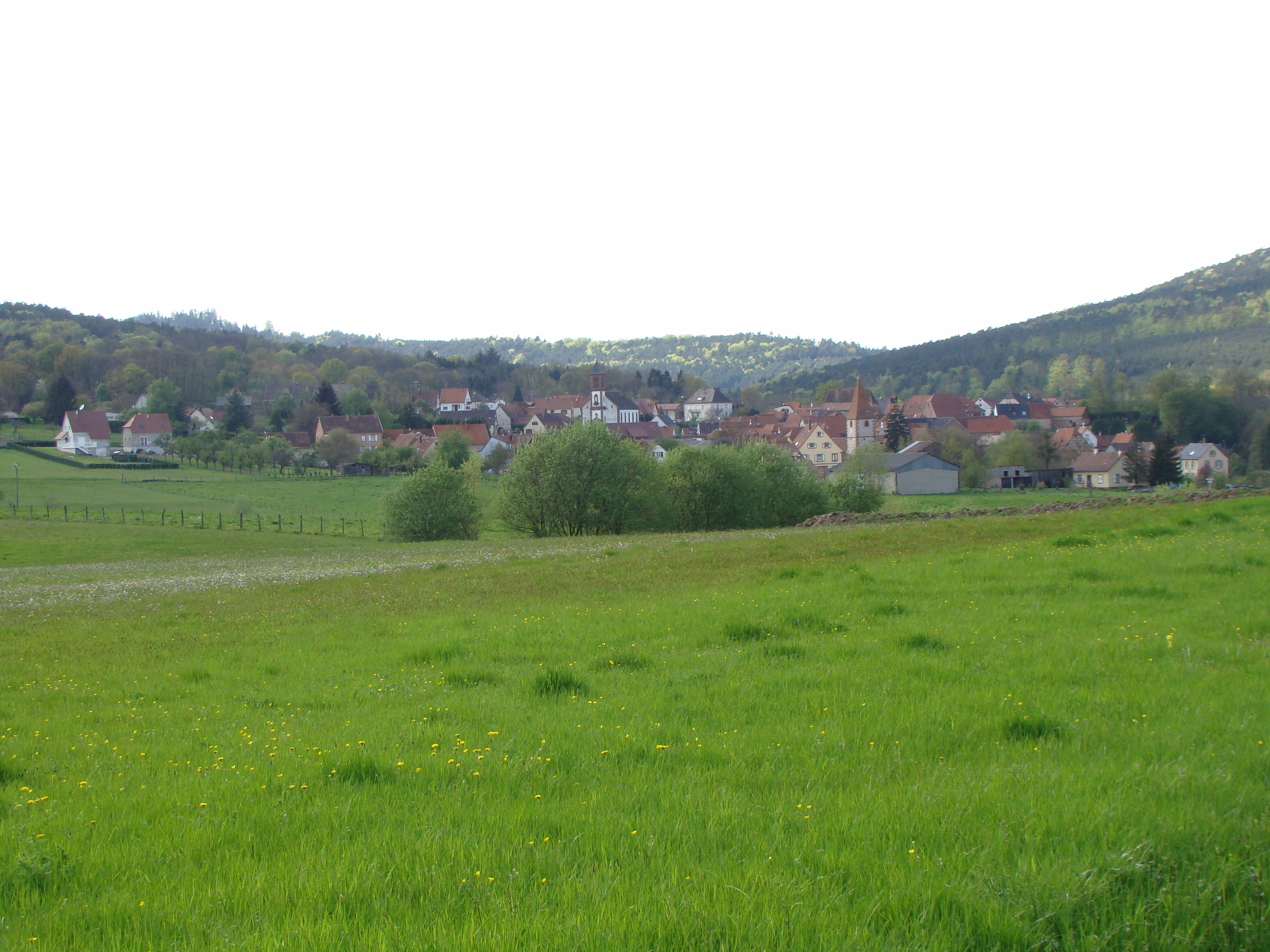
- A general view of Weiterswiller

- Coat of arms
- Location of Weiterswiller
- Location within France Location within Grand Est
- Coordinates: 48°51′15″N 7°24′47″E
- Country: France
- Region: Grand Est
- Department: Bas-Rhin
- Arrondissement: Saverne
- Canton: Ingwiller
- Intercommunality: Hanau-La Petite Pierre

Government
  - Mayor (2020–2026): Claude Eichwald
- Area^{1}: 7.91 km^{2} (3.05 sq mi)
- Elevation: 220 m (720 ft)
- Highest elevation: 410 m (1,350 ft)
- Lowest elevation: 199 m (653 ft)
- Population (2023): 515
  - Density: 65.1/km^{2} (169/sq mi)
- Time zone: UTC+01:00 (CET)
  - Summer (DST): UTC+02:00 (CEST)
- INSEE/Postal code: 67524 /67340
- ^{1} French Land Register data, which excludes lakes, ponds, glaciers > 1 km^{2} (0.386 sq mi or 247 acres) and river estuaries.

Weiterswiller (German: Weitersweiler) is a commune in the Bas-Rhin department in Grand Est in north-eastern France.

== Population ==
Historical population
| Year | Pop. | ±% p.a. |
|---|---|---|
| 1968 | 543 | — |
| 1975 | 564 | +0.54% |
| 1982 | 540 | −0.62% |
| 1990 | 540 | +0.00% |
| 1999 | 543 | +0.06% |
| 2007 | 574 | +0.70% |
| 2012 | 569 | −0.17% |
| 2017 | 521 | −1.75% |
| 2023 | 515 | −0.19% |
Source: INSEE

== See also ==
- Communes of the Bas-Rhin department
