= Dhyāna sutras =

Group of early Buddhist meditation texts

The Dhyāna sutras (Chinese: 禪經 chan jing) (Japanese 禅経 zen-gyo) or "meditation summaries" (Chinese: 禪要) or also known as The Zen Sutras are a group of early Buddhist meditation texts which are mostly based on the Yogacara (Note: To be distinguished from the Mahayana Yogacara school, though they may have been a precursor.) meditation teachings of the Sarvāstivāda school of Kashmir circa 1st–4th centuries CE. Most of the texts only survive in Chinese and were key works in the development of the Buddhist meditation practices of Chinese Buddhism.

== Overview ==
The Dhyāna sutras focus on the concrete details of the meditative practice of the Yogacarins of northern Gandhara and Kashmir, who were known as masters of Buddhist meditation. Kashmir probably became a center of dhyāna practice due to the efforts of Madhyāntika (Majjhantika), a disciple of Ānanda, who traveled north to practice and teach meditation.

The five main types of meditation in these sutras are:

- anapanasati (mindfulness of breathing),
- paṭikūlamanasikāra meditation – mindfulness of the impurities of the body,
- loving-kindness maitrī meditation,
- the contemplation on the twelve links of pratītyasamutpāda,
- the contemplation on the Buddha's thirty-two Characteristics.

In addition some sutras contain instructions on contemplation of the dhātu-s (elements); contemplation of white bones and fresh corpses; and contemplation of bodhisattvas such as Amitābha.

The content of these texts is connected with the Yogacara abhidharma works, especially the Abhidharmamahāvibhāsā-śāstra (MVŚ, 阿毗達磨大毗婆沙論), which frequently cites the practices of the early Yogacarins, and the large Yogācārabhūmi-śāstra (YBŚ).

Though the doctrines in these sutras are mostly in line with early Buddhist orthodoxy, they are the work of Buddhists and translators who also lived and traveled through Central Asia and China, therefore some of them also include Mahayana Buddhist teachings and meditation methods common to the Samadhi sutras. The Dhyāna sutras are thus a set of texts which illustrate the evolution of meditation from early Buddhist methods to Mahayana techniques. Sutras such as the Chanfa Yaojie (Chinese: 禪法要解, compiled in India no later than the third century) contain meditations which are derived from the earlier nikāyas as well as material dealing with the Mahayana bodhisattva ideal and Mahayana śūnyatā teachings.

== Translations ==
One of the earliest Chinese translators of meditation summaries was the Parthian meditation master An Shigao (安世高, 147–168 CE) who worked on various texts including the influential Anban shouyi jing (Sanskrit: Ānāpānasmṛti-sūtra), or the "Mindfulness of Breathing discourse". During the Eastern Han period the foremost meditation technique taught by An Shigao and his school was a form of anapanasati (annabanna 安那般那) which remained influential for centuries afterwards. Most of these summaries only survive in Chinese translation and often they are not in their original form but also include later accretions such as commentary work by Chinese translators. The difficulty of working with the Chinese translations is shown by the corrupt nature of the Da Anban shouyi jing, which according to Florin Deleanu "gathers together An Shigao's original translation, almost impossible to reconstruct, fragments from An Shigao's own commentary as well as fragments from glosses by Chen Hui, Kang Senghui, Zhi Dun, Daoan, and Xie Fu." A recently discovered manuscript of the Anban Shouyi Jing at Kongo-ji temple (Japan) seems to be an actual An Shigao translation. Other highly influential and widely studied An Shigao meditation treatises by early Chinese Buddhists include the 'Scripture on the Twelve Gates' (Shier men jing) and the 'Canonical Text Concerning the ''Skandha''-s, the Dhātu-s, and the Āyatana-s' (Yin chi ru jing, YCRJ). According to Eric Greene, the Scripture on the twelve gates and its commentary provide some of the most comprehensive information on the practice of early Chinese Meditation (Chan), while Zacchetti concludes in his paper on the YCRJ that this text was considered by An Shigao's disciples, Kang Senghui 康僧會 (? – 280 CE) and Chen Hui 陳慧, to be "one of their main doctrinal sources".

Another work, the Discourse on the Essential Secrets of Meditation (Taisho 15 no. 613) is one of the oldest texts to be translated into Chinese on the subject of meditation (circa 2nd or 3rd century CE) and therefore was likely to have had an influence on the meditation practices of Tiantai Buddhism and Chan Buddhism. This text belonged to the Buddhist Dārṣṭāntika school and the first Chinese translation was made by Zhi Qian in the early part of the 3rd century CE.

A later important Chinese translator of these texts was Kumārajīva (334–413 CE) who translated several important meditation sutras by 402. Kumarajiva's translated meditation scriptures such as the Chanfa yaojie (禪法要解) were widely promoted by his disciple Tao Sheng. A contemporary of Kumarajiviva, Buddhabhadra, a Sarvastivadin from Kapilavastu, translated the Damoduoluo chan jing (Dharmatrāta Dhyāna sūtra), a Sarvastivada Dārṣṭāntika meditation manual associated with the Indian teachers Dharmatrāta and Buddhasena. This text, written in verse, includes orthodox Sarvastivadin meditation techniques such as ānāpāna-smṛti as well as tantric Mahayanist practices such as visualization and maṇḍala instructions. Hence this work is proof that some later Mahayana meditation practices were derived from techniques developed by Sarvastivada Yogacarins. Taken together, the translations by Kumarajiva and Buddhabhadra of Sarvastivadin meditation manuals laid the groundwork for the practices of Chan Buddhism (Zen) and the works of the Tiantai meditation master Zhiyi.

== List of Dhyāna sutras ==
Early translations in Chinese

Translated or associated with An Shigao and his translation school:

- T602 Foshou da anban shouyi jing 佛說大安般守意經 – The Great Discourse by the Buddha on the Mindfulness of Ānāpānna.
- K-ABSYJ – Anban shouyi jing 安般守意經 [Kongō-ji manuscript]
- T603 :Yin chi ru jing 陰持入經 – Canonical Text Concerning the Skandhas, the Dhātus, and the Āyatanas.
- T1568 Scripture on the Twelve Gates (Shier men jing 十二門經)
- Explanations on the Scripture of the Twelve Gates (Jie Shier men jing 解十二門經)
- T605 禪行法想經 – Chan xing fa xiang jing – Discourse on Perception in the Law of Practice of Meditation
- Renben yusheng jing 人本欲生經
- T604 – Foshuo chanxing san shi qi pin jing (佛說禪行三十七品經), possibly not a translation by An Shigao.
- T607 daodi jing 大道地經
- T1694: Yin-chi ru jing zhu 陰持入經註
- T105: Wu yin piyu jing 五陰譬喩經
- T621 Foshou foyin sanmei jing (佛說佛印三昧經), Mahayana text, possibly not translated by An Shigao
- T622 the Foshuo zishi sanmei jing (佛說自誓三昧經), Mahayana text, possibly not translated by An Shigao
- T150A Qichu sanguan jing 七處三觀經
- Shiwei jing 思惟經 (Scripture on the Essential Method of Meditation) [LOST TEXT]

Other translators:

- Chan Yao Jing 禪要經, translated by Zhi Qian 223–253 CE.
- T606: Xiūxíng dào dì jīng 修行道地經 [Yogācārabhūmi of Saṅgharakṣa], translated by Dharmaraksa into Chinese in 284 CE. Detailed summary of the work in Demiéville 1954.

Fifth century texts (Note: Translation of titles and abbreviations according to Yamabe 1999, pp. 58–59)

Text preserved in Sanskrit

- The so-called Yogalehrbuch [Yoga textbook], a meditation manual found in Kizil Caves, reconstituted and edited by Schlingloff 1964.

Texts compiled by Kumarajiva (Note: At the request of his students, Kumārajīva made these compilations (zhuàn 撰) on dhyāna drawing from various Indian sources Demiéville 1954, 354, fn. 2 and Yamabe & Sueki 2009, xiv–xvii.)

- T614: Zuòchán sān mēi jīng 坐禪三昧經 [A Manual on the Samādhi of Sitting Meditation], ZSJ (also called the Bodhisattvadhyāna Pusa Chanfa Jing 菩薩禪法經 or The Sūtra on the Practice of Meditation in The Wilderness E lan Rou Xi Chan Fa Jing 阿蘭若習禪法經). Translated into English by Yamabe and Sueki 2009.
- T616: Chán fǎ yào jiě 禪法要解 [Essential Explanation of The Method of Dhyāna], CY. Translated into English by Hang Dat 2011.

Other texts:

- T617: Sīwéi lüè yào fǎ 思惟略要法 [The Abridged Essence of Meditation], SLF, translated c. 405 CE. Translated into English by Willemen 2012.
- T618: Dámóduōluó chán jīng 達摩多羅禪經 [Discours on meditation of Dharmatrāta], but the actual title should be [The *Yogācārabhūmi of Buddhasena], YBhB, translated into Chinese by Buddhabhadra, 398–421 CE. Translated into English by Chan 2013.
- T619: Wǔmén chán jīng yào yòngfǎ 五門禪經要用法 [The Essence of the Meditation Manual Consisting of Five Gates], WCYF, trans. Dharmamitra (356–442). Mongolian version translated into German by Pozdnejev 1927. Some parts of the manual, as it is edited in Taishō, are identical to the SLF (T617).
- T2914: Guān jīng 觀經 [Visalization Manual], Dunhuang manuscript of the London Collection (Stein 2585). Several sections correspond to the SLF and two were extracted from the WCYF. Another copy of the same text is to be found in the Paris collection (Pelliot chinois 3835–3, available at Gallica) and in Saint Petersburg (Дx15–2).

Chinese compositions:

- T613: Chán mì yào fǎ jīng 禪秘要法經 [Discourse on the Essential Secrets of Meditation], CMJ, attributed to Kumarajiva. Translated into English by Greene 2021b. This text, at the beginning, formed one text with the ZCMF (T620), and is an expansion of the WCYF (T619).
- T620: Zhì chán bìng mì yào fǎ 治禪病祕要法 [The Secret Essential Methods to Cure the Diseases Caused by Meditation], ZCMF, attributed to Juqu Jingsheng (5th century CE). Translated into English by Greene 2021b.
- T643: Guān fó sānmèi hǎi jīng 觀佛三昧海經 [Sūtra on the ocean-like Samādhi of the contemplation of the Buddha], GSHJ, chinese composition, based on Indian or Central Asian sources as demonstrated by Yamabe.

== See also ==
- Vimuttimagga
- Yogacara
- Anapanasati
- Sarvastivada

== Sources ==
- Chan, Yiu-Wing (2013). An English Translation of the Dharmatrāta-Dhyāna-Sūtra (達摩多羅禪經 T15, No. 618). With Annotation and a Critical Introduction (PDF) (PhD thesis). University of Hong Kong. Archived from the original (PDF) on 2016-03-04.
- Demiéville, Paul (1954). "La Yogācārabhūmi de Saṅgharakṣa" (PDF). Bulletin de l'École française d'Extrême-Orient. 44 (2): 339–436. doi:10.3406/befeo.1951.5178.
- Greene, Eric M. (2021a). Chan Before Chan: Meditation, Repentance, and Visionary Experience in Chinese Buddhism. Honolulu: University of Hawai'i Press.
- Greene, Eric M. (2021b). The Secrets of Buddhist Meditation: Visionary Meditation Texts from Early Medieval China. Honolulu: University of Hawai'i Press.
- Hang Dat, Thich (2011). A Reappraisal of Kumārājīva's Role in Medieval Chinese Buddhism: An Examination of Kumārājīva's Translation Text on 'The Essential Explanation of the Method of Dhyāna.' (PDF) (MA Thesis). University of the West. Archived from the original (PDF) on 2015-05-18.
- Pozdnejev, Aleksei Matveevitch (1927). Dhyāna und Samādhi im Mongolischen Lamaismus. Aus dem Russischen übersetzt und eingeleitet von W. A. Unkrig. Hannover: Orient-Buchhandlung Heinz Lafaire..
- Schlingloff, Dieter (1964). Ein buddhistisches Yogalehrbuch. Berlin: Akademie Verlag.. Reprinted as: Schlingloff, Dieter (1964). Hartmann, Jens-Uwe; Röllicke, Hermann-Joseph (eds.). Unveränderter Nachdruck unter Beigabe aller seither bekannt gewordenen Fragmente. München: Iudicium.
- Yamabe, Nobuyoshi (1999). The Sūtra of the Ocean-Like Samadhi of the Visualization of the Buddha: The Interfusion of the Chinese and Indian Cultures in Central Asian as Reflected in a Fifth Century Apocryphal Sūtra (PhD Dissertation). Yale University. ProQuest 304553335.
- Yamabe, Nobuyoshi; Sueki, Fumihiko (2009). The sutra on the concentration of sitting meditation (Taishō Volume 15, Number 614). Berkeley: Numata Center for Buddhist Translation and Research.
- Yamabe, Nobuyoshi (2010). "Two Chinese Meditation Manuals in Conjunction with Pozdneyev's Mongolian Manual". In Zin, Monika; Franco, Eli (eds.). From Turfan to Ajanta: Festschrift for Dieter Schlingloff on the Occasion of His Eightieth Birthday. Bhairahawa, Rupandehi: Lumbini International Research Institute. pp. 1045–58.
- Willemen, Charles (2012). Outlining the way to reflect (T. XV 617): Siwei lüeyao fa 思惟略要法. Mumbai: Somaiya Publications..

== Other sources ==
- Deleanu, Florin. 'Śrāvakayāna Yoga Practices and Mahāyāna Buddhism', Bulletin of the Graduate Division of Literature of Waseda University, Special Issue No. 20 (Philosophy–History), 1993.
- Deleanu, Florin. 'A Preliminary Study of An Shigao's Translation of the Yogācārabhūmi', The Journal of the Department of Liberal Arts of Kansai Medical University, Vol. 17, 1997.
- Greene, Eric. Of Bones and Buddhas: Contemplation of the Corpse and its Connection to Meditations on Purity as Evidenced by 5th Century Chinese Meditation Manuals. M.A. Thesis. University of California, 2006.
