= Walking meditation =

Buddhist meditative practice

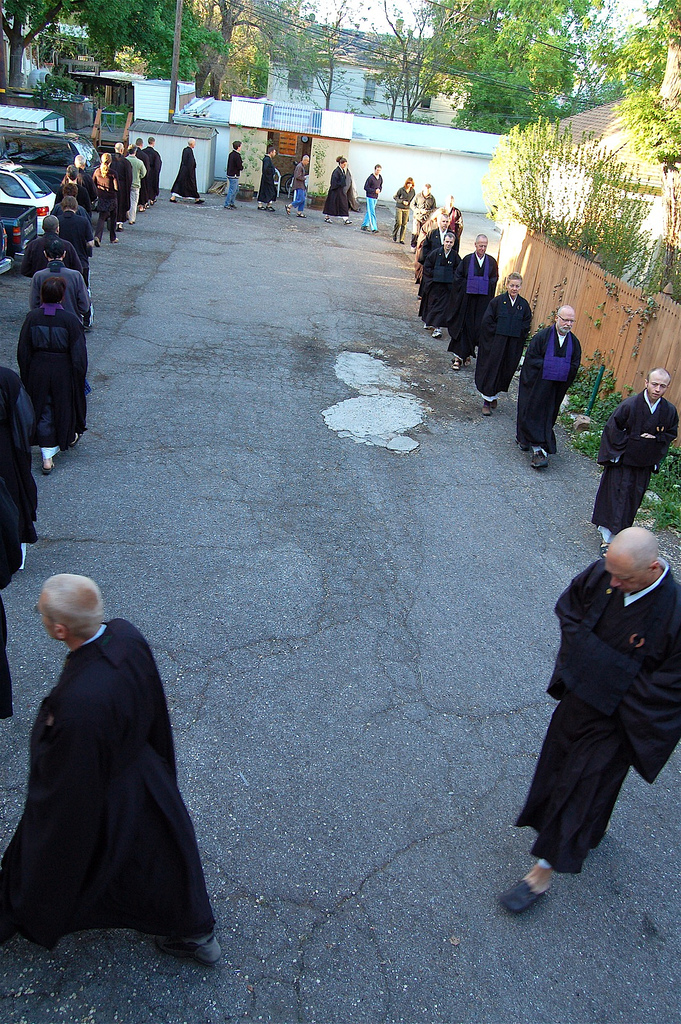
Members of Kanzeon Zen Center during kinhin

Walking meditation (Chinese: 經行; Pinyin: jīngxíng; Romaji: kinhin or kyōgyō; Korean: gyeonghyaeng; Vietnamese: kinh hành) is a meditation practice done while walking common in Buddhism. It can be done as a standalone practice or as a break in between long periods of sitting meditation. In different forms, the practice is common in various traditions of both Theravada and in Mahayana Buddhism. The term kinhin consists of the Chinese words 經, meaning "to go through (like the thread in a loom)", with "sutra" as a secondary meaning, and 行, meaning "walk". Taken literally, the phrase means "to walk straight back and forth."

== Theravāda ==
In Theravāda Buddhism, walking meditation is frequently performed in conjunction with seated meditation. Walking meditation is particularly emphasized in forest monastic traditions and in vipassana traditions, where meditators alternate between sitting and walking to sustain mindfulness and balance energy levels. In Theravāda, walking meditation involves walking a straight path back and forth, often around 30 to 40 feet long. The meditator may walk slowly, placing attention on the sensations in the feet as they touch the ground. In the Vipassana movement traditions, the meditator silently notes the various walking sensations with phrases like "lifting", "moving", and "placing" (the foot). The goal is to develop sati (mindfulness) by staying present through the act of walking.

This practice cultivates concentration and calms restlessness while training the mind to observe phenomena without attachment or aversion. In Vipassanā, or insight meditation, walking is used to deepen awareness of impermanence (anicca), suffering (dukkha), and non-self (anattā). The sensations experienced while walking—such as the contact of the feet, the rise and fall of the body, or environmental sounds—are observed as fleeting and insubstantial. Walking meditation thus becomes a tool for observing the arising and passing of phenomena, leading to direct insight into the nature of reality.

== Mahāyāna ==
East Asian Mahāyāna Buddhism integrates walking meditation with devotional and samādhi-oriented practices. Among its many forms, devotional circumambulation and specific methods such as the Tiantai four samādhis, and the Pure Land practice of walking nianfo hold significant importance for specific traditions. In the Tiantai (Jp: Tendai) school, they follow the Móhē zhǐguān of patriarch Zhiyi as the main meditation guide. This tradition practices two kinds of walking meditations: "Constantly Walking Samādhi" (chángxíng sānmèi 常行三昧) which consists of 90 days of mindful walking and meditating on Amitabha and "Half-Walking Half-Seated Samādhi" (bànxíng bànzuò sānmèi 半行半坐三昧) which includes numerous practices like chanting, penance, prayer, reciting the Lotus sutra, etc. In the Pure Land school, there is a common practice of circumambulating a Buddha statue of Amitabha and reciting his name during nianfo retreats.

In Zen Buddhism, kinhin is often done in between stretches of sitting meditation (zazen) as a break from prolonged sitting. The idea is to maintain the same meditative Zen mind throughout the walking period. Practitioners typically walk clockwise around the meditation hall or zendō while holding their hands in a gesture with one hand closed in a fist while the other hand grasps or covers the fist (Chinese: 叉手; pinyin: chā shǒu; rōmaji: shashu). During walking meditation each step is taken after each full breath. The pace of walking meditation can be either slow (several steady steps per each breath) or brisk, almost to the point of jogging.

== See also ==
- Ānāpānasati
- Anussati
- Buddhist meditation
- Circumambulation
- Jarāmaraṇa
- Samatha
- Shikantaza
- Vipassanā

== Sources ==
- Smith, L. (2023). 28 Meditation Statistics: How Many People Meditate? The Good Body. https://www.thegoodbody.com/meditation-statistics/
- Team, M. (2022). How Many People Meditate? Mindworks Meditation. https://mindworks.org/blog/how-many-people-meditate/
- Wise, J. (2023). Meditation Statistics 2023: Popularity, Industry & Market Size - EarthWeb. EarthWeb. https://earthweb.com/meditation-statistics/#:~:text=Meditation%20Statistics%202023-,Approximately%20200%20to%20500%20million%20people%20across%20the%20globe%20partake,reduce%20school%20suspensions%20by%2045%25.

=== Bibliography ===
- Aitken, Robert (1999). Taking the Path of Zen. North Point Press. pp. 35–36. ISBN 0-86547-080-4.
- Maezumi, Hakuyu Taizan; Glassman, Bernie (2002). On Zen Practice: Body, Breath, Mind. Wisdom Publications. pp. 48–49. ISBN 086171315X.
- Jin, Putai. "Efficacy of Tai Chi, Brisk Walking, Meditation, and Reading In Reducing Mental and Emotional Stress". doi.org/10.1016/0022-3999(92)90072-A
- Prakhinkit, Susaree "Effects of Buddhist Walking Meditation on glycemic control and vascular functions in patients with Type-2 Diabetes." Journal of Alternative and Complementary Medicine doi.org/10.1016/j.ctim.2016.03.009
- Prakhinkit, Susaree "Effects of Buddhism walking meditation on depression, functional fitness, and endothelium-dependent vasodilation in depressed elderly." Journal of Alternative and Complementary Medicine, vol. 20, no. 5, 2014, doi.org/10.1089/acm.2013.0205
- Chatutain, Apsornsawan “Walking Meditation Promotes Ankle Proprioception and Balance Performance among Elderly Women.” doi.org/10.1016/j.jbmt.2018.09.152
- Smith, Alison. “Walking Meditation: Being Present and Being Pilgrim on the Camino De Santiago.” Religions, vol. 9, no. 3, 2018, p. 82., doi:10.3390/rel9030082
