= Ganana =

Technique in Buddhist meditation

Gaṇanā (Pali, "counting") is the technique of breath counting in Buddhist meditation. It focuses on drawing mental attention to breathing by counting numerically inhalation and exhalation. It is part of the six stages of anapanasati described by authors like Vasubandhu and Zhiyi, composed by counting breath (ganana), following the motions of the air flow (anugama), stilling thought in the body (sthana or sthapana), observing the elements of air (upalakshana), transformation of the mind focused on the air (vivarthana) and entering the path of vision (parisuddhi). Those stages are increasingly subtle and lead to control of mind, producing samadhi in order to achieve vipassana.

In Zen Buddhism, the art of breath counting is named sūsoku-kan (数息観, "number breath viewing"), although the word is used to refer to anapanasati in a general way.

== Technique ==
The practitioner must fix the mind upon the inhalation and exhalation, without giving consideration to the state of his body or mind, and count mentally his breaths from one up to ten. One must keep count of every number; if the mind becomes distracted at some point, one must count anew from the starting point until samadhi is accomplished enough to avoid error.

Asanga considers breath counting to be apt for beginners to anapana, while advanced aspirants should be able to concentrate on breathing without counting. He cites four different classifications of the counting technique:

- Ekaika-ganana: when the practitioner breathes in, counts one; when he breathes out, counts two, and so on.
- Dvayaika-ganana: when he completes the cycle of breathing in and out, he counts one; upon completing it again, it counts two.
- Anuloma-ganana: he counts from one to ten and again from one.
- Pratiloma-ganana: starting from ten, he counts backwards to one and again from ten.

Buddhaghosa established ganana as the first of four phases, followed by continuously following the flow of air as it enters in and out of the body (anubandhanā), resting attention on the nose tip where the passage of air can be felt (phusanā) and fixing or settling the mind (ṭhapanā), which are then followed by four other stages. For counting the breath, ten breaths must be counted, for under five thoughts become too cramped, and over ten the mind wanders.

Zhiyi, while listing the six stages into nirvana, warns the practitioner must regulate his breath while counting, not allowing it to be too shallow, too rough or too smooth. He also enumerates three main techniques:

- Counting one after inhalating and exhalating, counting two after inhalating and exhalating again, and so on.
- Counting after every inhalation.
- Counting after every exhalation.

== In Zen Buddhism ==
The Rinzai school holds susokukan as one of its main mind alignement techniques along with koan work. It is usual that after achieving susoku, the practitioner initiates koan kufu or meditation with koan. Some masters consider it a beginner's technique or a breathing exercise. Even then, some masters still recommend susoku as a way to assist koan meditation or for its value alone. It is also considered a way to gather ki in the abdomen or tanden.

The usual method is counting every exhalation up to ten and again from one, starting up again from one if losing count. By bringing the attention continually to the count, the student learns to keep from being distracted. It also teaches the importance of good posture and breathing, as those make counting easier. It is also possible to count from one to a hundred or a thousand, or even internally recite one over and over. Another method used is counting one while breathing in, two while breathing out, three while inhaling again, until ten. Breath control is exerted during the exercise, maintaining abdominal breathing while focusing on the outbreath, which should last for eight to fifteen seconds.

In the Sōtō school of Zen, susoku was considered by Dogen to be a holdover from hinayana (theravada), although Keizan recommended it, and today it is still cultivated within the school.

== See also ==
- Dhāraṇā
- Samyama
