= Outline of Buddhism =

Overview of and topical guide to Budddhism

Dharmachakra, symbol of the Dharma, the Buddha's teaching of the path to enlightenment

Buddhism (Pali and Sanskrit: बौद्ध धर्म Buddha Dharma) is a religion and philosophy encompassing a variety of traditions, beliefs and practices, largely based on teachings attributed to Siddhartha Gautama, commonly known as the Buddha, "the awakened one".

The following outline is provided as an overview of, and topical guide to, Buddhism.

== The Buddha ==
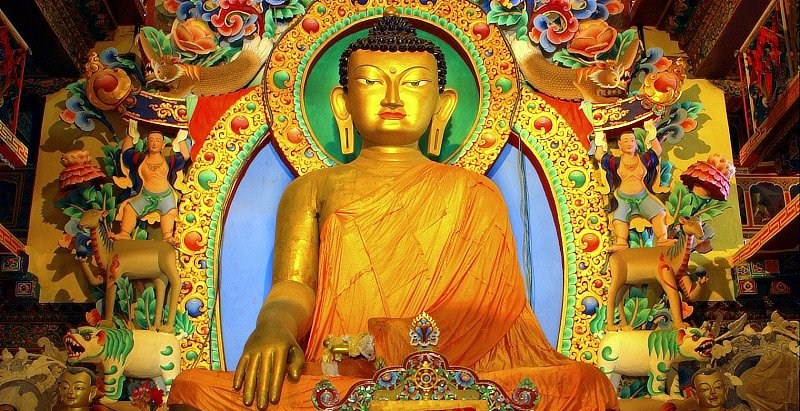
Gautama Buddha

Gautama Buddha

- Tathāgata — meaning "Thus Come One" and "Thus Gone One" simultaneously, the epithet the Buddha uses most often to refer to himself; occasionally it is used as a general designation for a person who has reached the highest attainment
- Buddha's Birthday
- Eight Great Events
- The Four Sights — observations that affected Prince Siddhartha deeply and made him realize the sufferings of all beings, and compelled him to begin his spiritual journey
  - An old man
  - A sick man
  - A dead man
  - An ascetic/Monk
- Qualities of the Buddha
  - Abandonment of all defilements (kilesa — principally greed, hatred and delusion) together with their residual impressions (vasana)
    - All defilements have been abandoned totally – all defilements have been destroyed with none remaining
    - All defilements have been abandoned completely – each defilement has been destroyed at the root, without residue
    - All defilements have been abandoned finally – no defilement can ever arise again in the future
  - Acquisition of all virtues
    - Great Wisdom (Mahapaññā)
      - Extensiveness of range – understanding the totality of existent phenomena
      - Profundity of view – understanding the precise mode of existence of each phenomenon
    - Great Compassion (Maha-karuṇā)
- Physical characteristics of the Buddha
- Buddha footprint
- Buddha statue (Buddharupa)
- Iconography of Gautama Buddha in Laos and Thailand
- Depictions of Gautama Buddha in film
- Miracles of Gautama Buddha
- List of places where Gautama Buddha stayed
- Colours of Buddha's aura (prabashvara)
  - Sapphire blue (nila)
  - Golden yellow (pita)
  - Crimson (lohita)
  - White (odata)
  - Scarlet (manjesta)
- Family of Gautama Buddha
  - Śuddhodana (father)
  - Māyā (mother)
  - Yasodharā (wife)
  - Rāhula (son)
  - Mahāpajāpatī Gotamī (foster mother)
  - Nanda (half-brother)
  - Ānanda (cousin)
  - Anuruddha (cousin)
  - Devadatta (cousin)
- Teachers of the Bodhisatta Gotama
  - Āḷāra Kālāma — taught Gautama the Jhanic Stage of nothingness
  - Uddaka Rāmaputta — taught Gautama the Jhanic Stage of neither perception nor non-perception
- Gautama Buddha in world religions
  - Gautama Buddha in Hinduism

== Branches of Buddhism ==
=== Schools of Buddhism ===
Schools of Buddhism

Timeline: Development and propagation of Buddhist traditions (c. 450 BCE – c. 1300 CE)

450 BCE (Note: Cousins, L. S. (1996); Buswell (2003), Vol. I, p. 82; and, Keown & Prebish (2004), p. 107. See also, Gombrich (1988/2002), p. 32: “…[T]he best we can say is that [the Buddha] was probably Enlightened between 550 and 450, more likely later rather than earlier.")
250 BCE
100 CE
500 CE
700 CE
800 CE
1200 CE (Note: Williams (2000, pp. 6-7) writes: "As a matter of fact Buddhism in mainland India itself had all but ceased to exist by the thirteenth century CE, although by that time it had spread to Tibet, China, Japan, and Southeast Asia." (Originally 1958), "Chronology," p. xxix: "c. 1000–1200: Buddhism disappears as [an] organized religious force in India." See also, Robinson & Johnson (1970/1982), pp. 100–101, 108 Fig. 1; and, Harvey (1990/2007), pp. 139–140.)

India

Early
Saṅgha

Early Buddhist schools
Mahāyāna
Vajrayāna

Sri Lanka &
Southeast Asia

Theravāda

Tibetan Buddhism

Nyingma

Kadam
Kagyu

Dagpo
Sakya

Jonang

East Asia

Early Buddhist schools
and Mahāyāna
(via the Silk Road
to China, and ocean
contact from India to Vietnam)

Tangmi

Nara (Rokushū)

Shingon

Chan

Thiền, Seon

Zen
Tiantai / Jìngtǔ

Tendai

Nichiren

Jōdo-shū

Central Asia & Tarim Basin

Greco-Buddhism

Silk Road Buddhism

450 BCE
250 BCE
100 CE
500 CE
700 CE
800 CE
1200 CE

Legend:	= Theravāda	= Mahāyāna	= Vajrayāna	= Various / syncretic

==== Theravāda ====
Theravada — literally, "the Teaching of the Elders" or "the Ancient Teaching", it is the oldest surviving Buddhist school. It was founded in India. It is relatively conservative, and generally closer to early Buddhism, and for many centuries has been the predominant religion of Sri Lanka (now about 70% of the population) and most of continental Southeast Asia.

- Bangladesh:
  - Sangharaj Nikaya
  - Mahasthabir Nikaya
- Burma:
  - Thudhamma Nikaya
    - Vipassana tradition of Mahasi Sayadaw
  - Shwekyin Nikaya
  - Dvaya Nikaya or Dvara Nikaya
- Cambodia
- Laos
- Sri Lanka:
  - Siam Nikaya
  - Amarapura Nikaya
  - Ramañña Nikaya
- Thailand:
  - Maha Nikaya
    - Dhammakaya Movement
  - Thammayut Nikaya
    - Thai Forest Tradition
      - Tradition of Ajahn Chah

==== Mahāyāna ====
Mahayana — literally the "Great Vehicle", it is the largest school of Buddhism, and originated in India. The term is also used for classification of Buddhist philosophies and practice. According to the teachings of Mahāyāna traditions, "Mahāyāna" also refers to the path of seeking complete enlightenment for the benefit of all sentient beings, also called "Bodhisattvayāna", or the "Bodhisattva Vehicle."

- Madhyamaka
  - Prāsangika
  - Svatantrika
  - Sanlun (Three Treatise school)
    - Sanron
  - Maha-Madhyamaka (Jonangpa)
- Yogācāra
  - Cittamatra in Tibet
  - Wei-Shi (Consciousness-only school) or Faxiang (Dharma-character school)
    - Beopsang
    - Hossō
- Tathagatagarbha
  - Daśabhūmikā (absorbed into Huayan)
  - Huayan (Avataṃsaka)
    - Hwaeom
    - Kegon
- Chán / Zen / Seon / Thien
  - Caodong
    - Sōtō
      - Keizan line
      - Jakuen line
      - Giin line
  - Linji
    - Rinzai
    - Ōbaku
    - Fuke
    - Won Buddhism: Korean Reformed Buddhism
- Pure Land (Amidism)
  - Jodo Shu
  - Jodo Shinshu
- Tiantai (Lotus Sutra School)
  - Cheontae
  - Tendai (also contains Vajrayana elements)
- Nichiren
  - Nichiren Shū
  - Nichiren Shōshū
  - Nipponzan Myōhōji
  - Soka Gakkai

==== Vajrayāna ====
Vajrayana

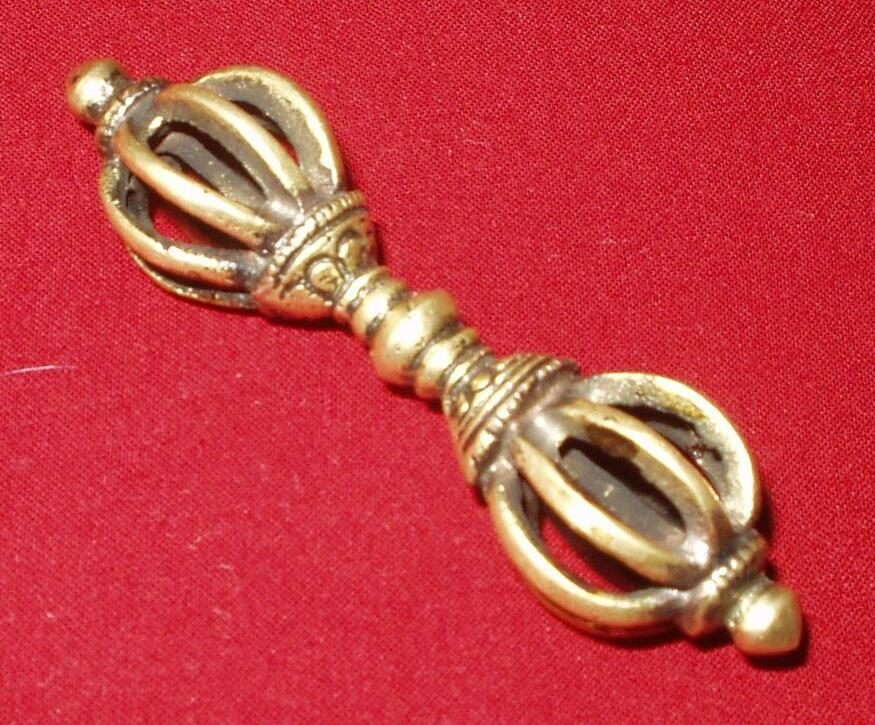
The vajra, a distinct symbol of Vajrayana

- Tibetan Buddhism
  - Nyingma
  - New Bön (synthesis of Yungdrung Bön and Nyingmapa)
  - Kadam
  - Bodong
  - Sakya
    - Ngor-pa
    - Tsar-pa
  - Jonang
  - Gelug
  - Kagyu:
    - Shangpa Kagyu
    - Marpa Kagyu:
      - Rechung Kagyu
      - Dagpo Kagyu:
        - Karma Kagyu (or Kamtshang Kagyu)
        - Tsalpa Kagyu
        - Baram Kagyu
        - Pagtru Kagyu (or Phagmo Drugpa Kagyu):
          - Taglung Kagyu
          - Trophu Kagyu
          - Drukpa Kagyu
          - Martsang Kagyu
          - Yerpa Kagyu
          - Yazang Kagyu
          - Shugseb Kagyu
          - Drikung Kagyu
  - Rime movement (ecumenical movement)
- Japanese Mikkyo
  - Shingon
  - Tendai (derived from Tiantai but added tantric practices)

==== Early Buddhist schools ====
Early Buddhist schools

- Mahāsaṃghika
  - Ekavyahārikas (during Aśoka)
    - Lokottaravāda
  - Golulaka (during Aśoka)
    - Bahuśrutīya (late third century BCE)
    - Prajñaptivāda (late third century BCE)
  - Caitika (mid-first century BCE)
    - Apara Śaila
    - Uttara Śaila
  - Cetiyavāda
- Sthaviravāda
  - Pudgalavāda ('Personalist') (c. 280 BCE)
    - Vatsīputrīya (during Aśoka) later name: Saṃmitīya
    - Dharmottarīya
    - Bhadrayānīya
    - Sannāgarika
  - Vibhajjavāda (prior to 240 BCE; during Aśoka)
    - Theravāda (c. 240 BCE)
    - Mahīśāsaka (after 232 BCE)
      - Dharmaguptaka (after 232 BCE)
  - Sarvāstivāda (c. 237 BCE)
    - Kāśyapīya (after 232 BCE)
    - Sautrāntika (between 50 BCE and c. 100 CE)
    - Mūlasarvāstivāda (3rd and 4th centuries)
    - Vaibhashika

==== Buddhist modernism ====
Buddhist modernism

- Humanistic Buddhism
- Navayana
- Sōka Gakkai
- Vipassana movement
- New Kadampa Tradition
- Friends of the Western Buddhist Order
- Fo Guang Shan

=== Buddhism worldwide ===
Buddhism by country

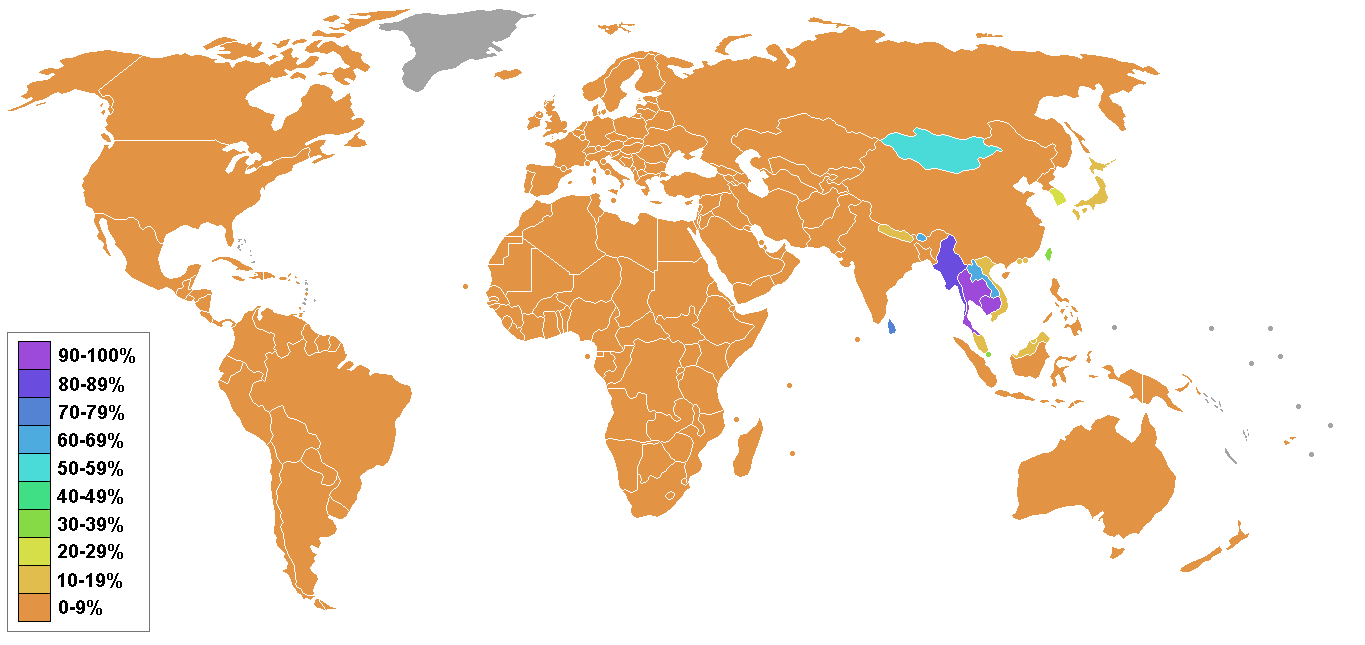
Percentage of formal/practicing Buddhists by the numbers of registered adherents (according to the least estimates).

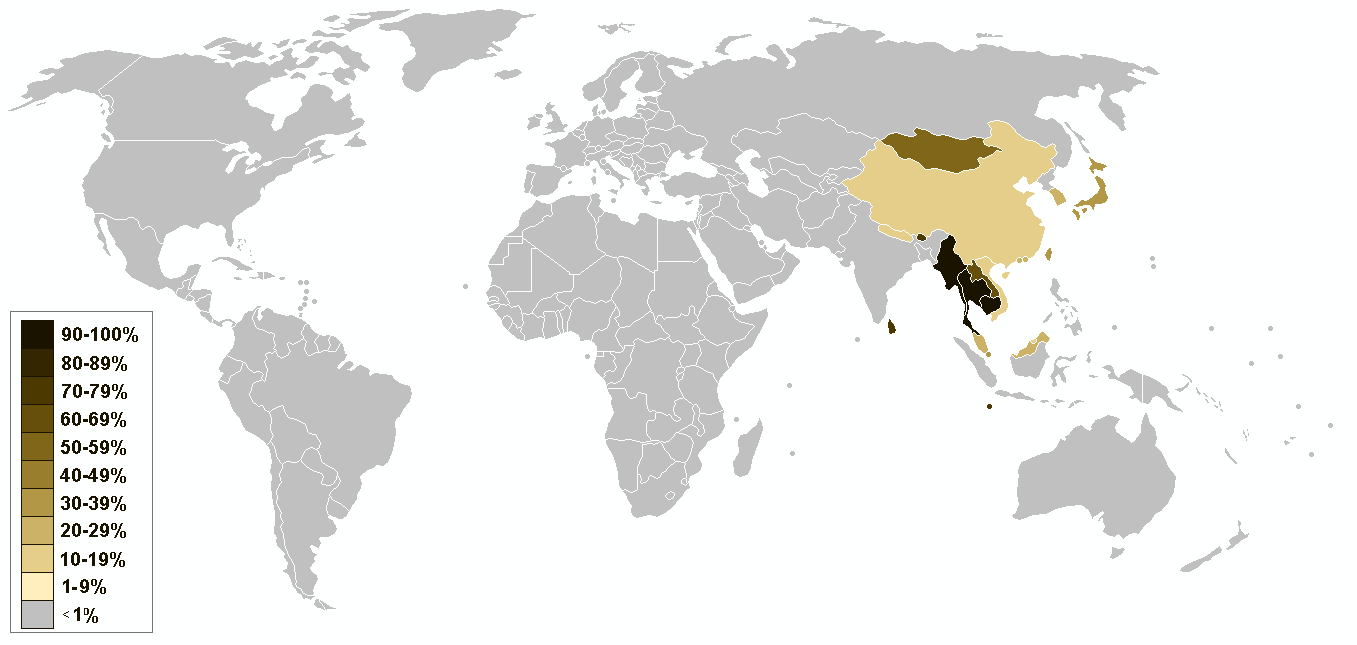
Percentage of cultural/nominal adherents of combined Buddhism with its related religions (according to the highest estimates).

- Buddhism by country
- Buddhism in the East
    - Tamil Buddhism
  - Buddhism in Central Asia
  - Buddhism in Southeast Asia
  - East Asian Buddhism
- Buddhism in the Middle East
- Buddhism in the West
  - Buddhism in the Americas
    - Buddhism in Central America
  - Buddhism in Australia
  - Buddhism in Europe
- Buddhism in Africa

== Buddhist scriptures and texts ==
Buddhist texts

=== Theravada texts ===
Pali literature

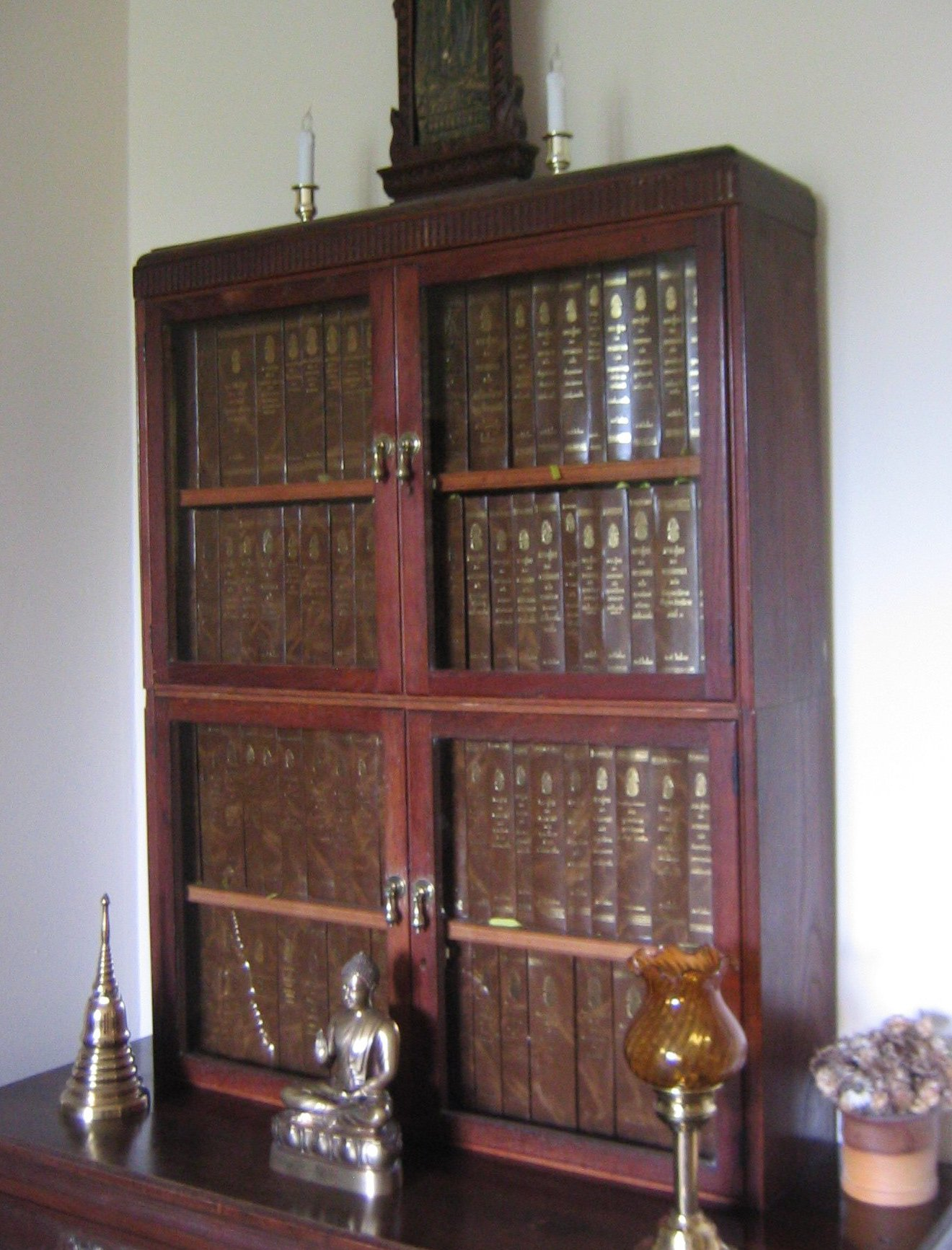
A collection of the Pali canon.

- Pāli Canon (Tipitaka)
  - Vinaya Pitaka — Basket of Discipline
    - Suttavibhanga
      - Patimokkha — Buddhist Monastic Code
    - Khandhaka
      - Mahāvagga
      - Cullavagga
    - Parivara
  - Sutta Pitaka — Basket of Discourses
    - Digha Nikaya — the Long Discourses
      - Brahmajala Sutta — Discourse on the Net of Perfect Wisdom
      - Samaññaphala Sutta — The Fruit of Contemplative Life Discourse
      - Kevatta Sutta
      - Mahaparinibbana Sutta — The Last Days of the Buddha
      - Mahasatipatthana Sutta — The Great Discourse on the Foundations of Mindfulness
      - Aggañña Sutta
      - Sigalovada Sutta
    - Majjhima Nikaya — the Middle-length Discourses
      - Sammaditthi Sutta — Discourse on Right View
      - Satipatthana Sutta — The Discourse on the Foundations of Mindfulness
      - Aggi-Vacchagotta Sutta
      - Anapanasati Sutta — Discourse on Mindfulness of Breathing
    - Samyutta Nikaya — the Connected Discourses
      - Dhammacakkappavattana Sutta — Setting Rolling the Wheel of Truth (Buddha's first discourse)
      - Anattalakkhana Sutta — The Nonself Characteristic (Buddha's second discourse)
      - Fire Sermon — Buddha's third discourse
    - Anguttara Nikaya — the Numerical Discourses
      - Dighajanu Sutta
      - Dona Sutta
      - Kalama Sutta
      - Upajjhatthana Sutta — Subjects for Contemplation
    - Khuddaka Nikaya — the Minor Collection
      - Khuddakapatha
        - Mangala Sutta
        - Ratana Sutta
        - Karaṇīya Mettā Sutta — The Hymn of Universal Love
      - Dhammapada — The Path of Truth
      - Udana — Inspired utterances
      - Itivuttaka
      - Suttanipata
        - Uraga Vagga
          - Rhinoceros Horn Sutra
          - Metta Sutta
        - Cula Vagga
          - Ratana Sutta
          - Mangala Sutta
          - Dhammika Sutta
        - Maha Vagga
        - Atthaka Vagga
        - Parayana Vagga
      - Vimanavatthu
      - Petavatthu
      - Theragatha — Verses of the Elder Monks
      - Therigatha — Verses of the Elder Nuns
      - Jataka tales — Buddha's former lives
      - Niddesa
      - Patisambhidamagga — Path of discrimination
      - Apadana
      - Buddhavamsa
      - Cariyapitaka
      - Nettipakarana
      - Petakopadesa
      - Milindapanha
  - Abhidhamma Pitaka — Basket of Ultimate Doctrine
    - Dhammasangani
    - Vibhanga
    - Dhatukatha
    - Puggalapannatti
    - Kathavatthu
    - Yamaka
    - Patthana
- Anupitaka — non-canonical or extra-canonical Pāli literature
  - Paracanonical texts
- Commentaries — commentaries on the Tipitaka
  - Subcommentaries — commentaries on the commentaries on the Tipitaka
  - Visuddhimagga — The Path of Purification, considered the most important Theravada text outside of the Tipitaka canon of scriptures
  - Vimuttimagga — The Path of Freedom, manual of meditation
  - Abhidhammattha Sangaha — A Comprehensive Manual of Abhidhamma

=== Mahayana texts ===
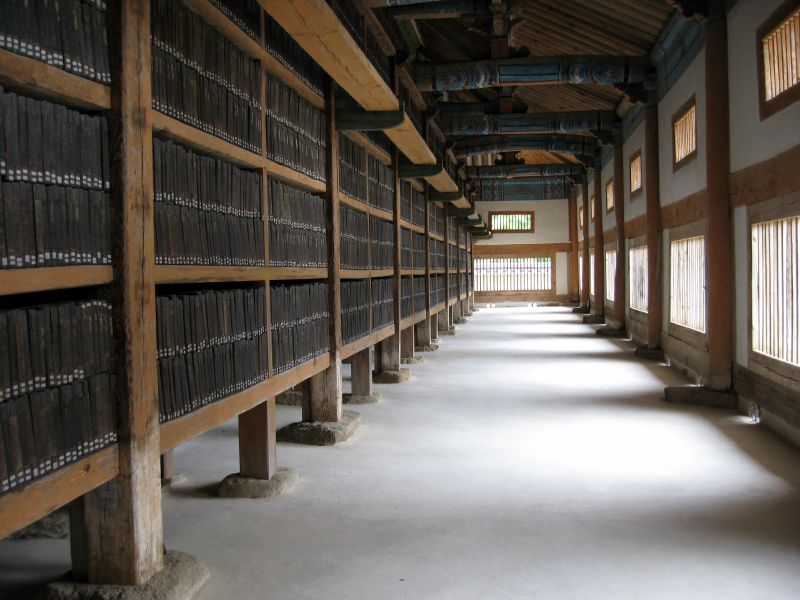
The Tripitaka Koreana in storage at Haeinsa.

- Mahayana sutras
  - Angulimaliya Sutra
  - Brahmajala Sutra
  - Innumerable Meanings Sutra
  - Lalitavistara Sutra
  - Lankavatara Sutra
  - Lotus Sutra
  - Perfection of Wisdom sutras (Prajñāpāramitā)
    - Diamond Sutra
    - Heart Sutra
  - Ten Stages Sutra
  - Vimalakirti-nirdesa Sutra
  - Sutra of Perfect Enlightenment
  - Platform Sutra
  - Amitabha Sutra
  - Avatamsaka Sutra
  - Contemplation Sutra
  - Infinite Life Sutra
  - Mahaparinirvana Sutra
  - Mahasamnipata Sutra
  - Sanghata Sutra
  - Shurangama Sutra
  - Sutra of Forty-Two Sections
  - Sutra of Golden Light
- Sutra of The Great Vows of Ksitigarbha Bodhisattva
  - Ullambana Sutra
- Āgamas
- Chinese Buddhist canon
  - Tripitaka Koreana

=== Vajrayana texts ===
- Buddhist Tantras
  - Guhyasamāja Tantra
  - Mahavairocana Tantra
  - Vajrasekhara Sutra
  - Hevajra Tantra
  - Cakrasaṃvara Tantra
  - Guhyagarbha tantra
  - Mañjuśrī-mūla-kalpa
  - Shurangama Sutra
  - Mañjuśrīnāmasamgīti
  - Kalachakra Tantra
- Nyingma Gyubum
  - Guhyagarbha tantra
  - Kulayarāja Tantra
  - Seventeen tantras of Dzogchen
  - Vima Nyingtik
  - Longchen Nyingthig
- Tibetan Buddhist canon
  - Kangyur
  - Tengyur
- Terma (hidden treasure) literature
  - Bardo Thodol

== History of Buddhism ==
History of Buddhism

- Timeline of Buddhism
- Pre-sectarian Buddhism
- Buddhist councils
  - First Buddhist council
  - Second Buddhist council
  - Third Buddhist council
  - Fourth Buddhist council
  - Fifth Buddhist council
  - Sixth Buddhist council
- World Buddhist Forum, 2006
- Silk Road transmission of Buddhism
- History of Buddhism in India
  - Decline of Buddhism in India
- Greco-Buddhism
- Buddhism and the Roman world
- Buddhist crisis

== Doctrines of Buddhism ==
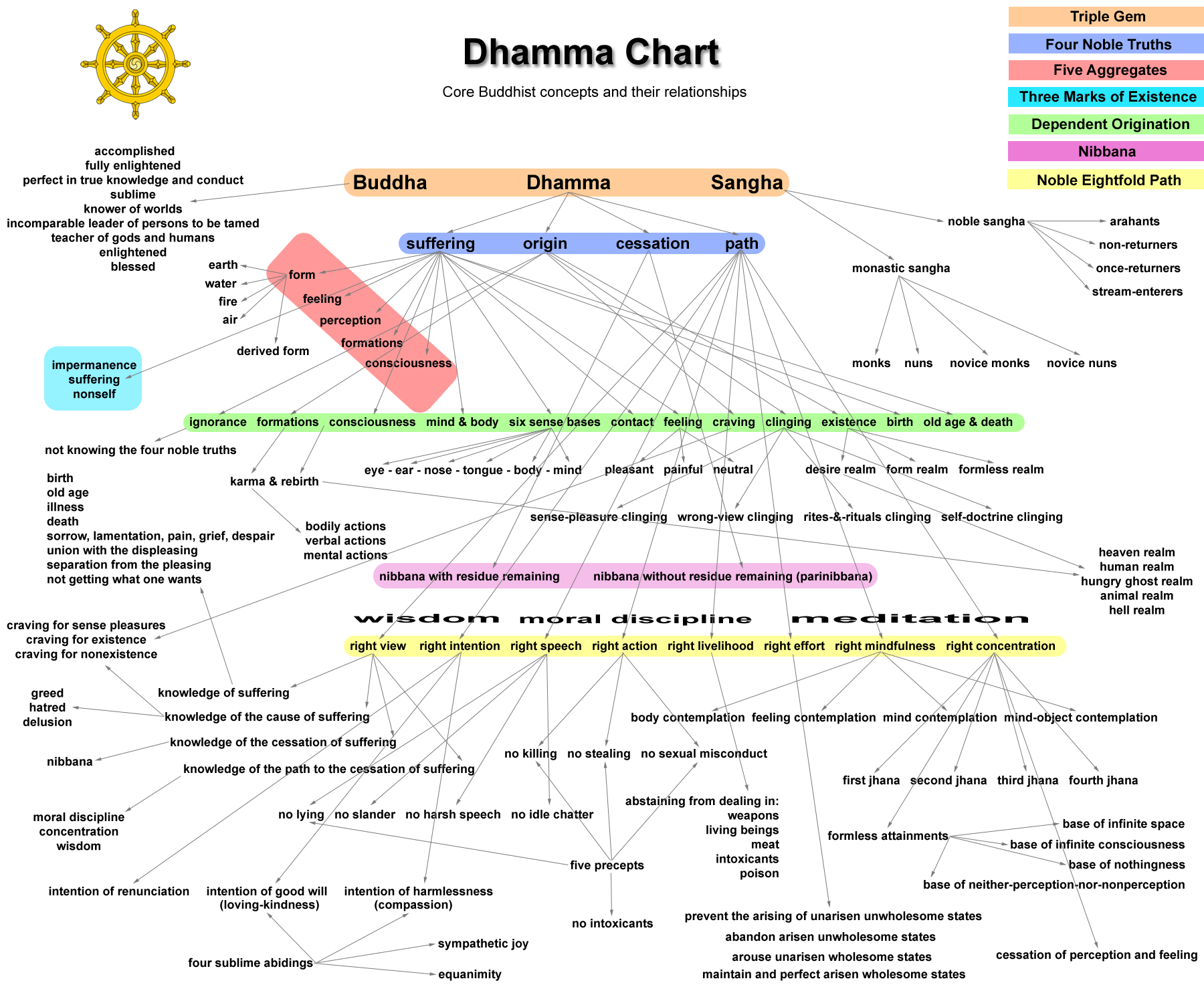
Core Buddhist concepts and their relationships

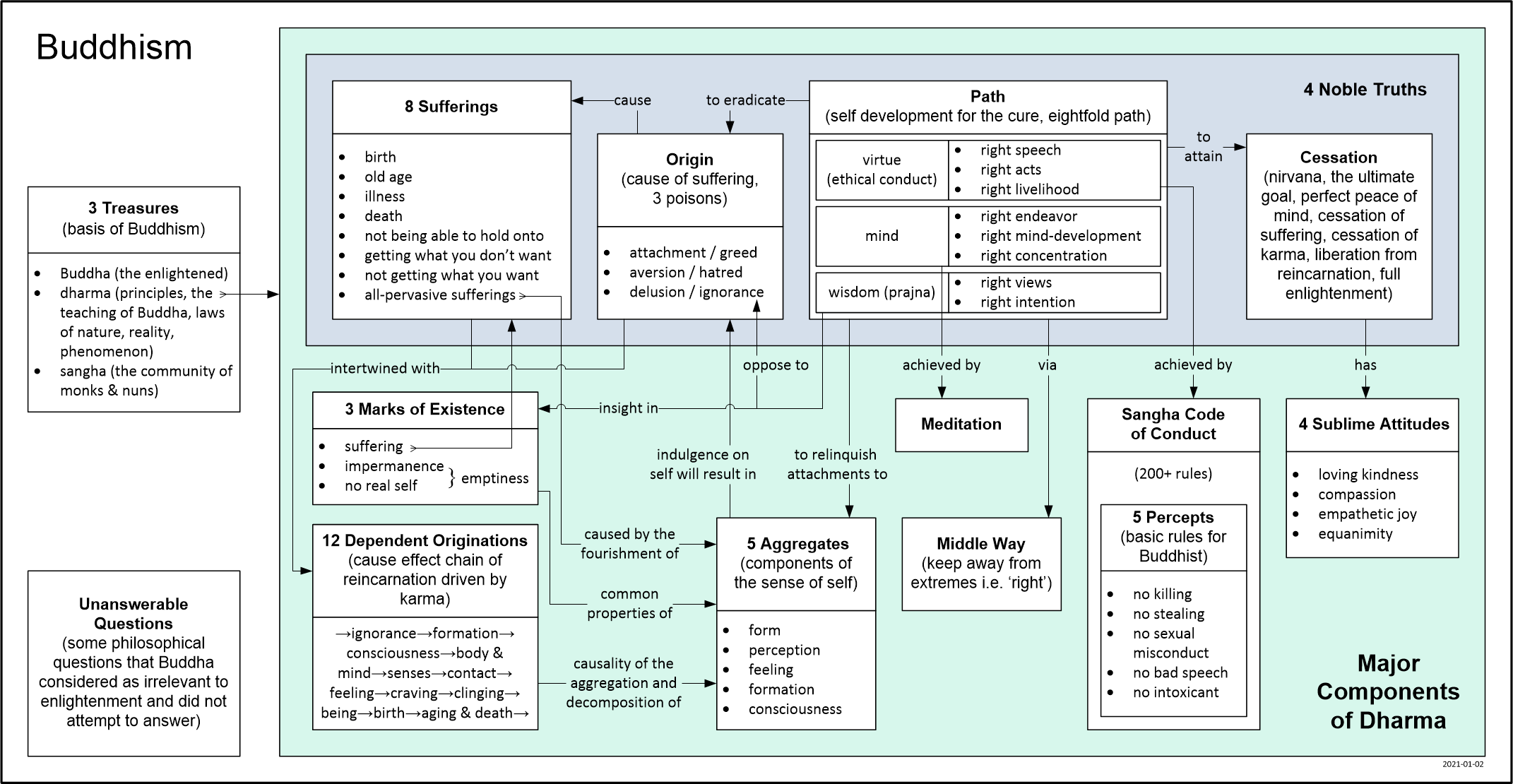
The relationship between the major concepts in Buddhism

=== Three Jewels (Tiratana • Triratna) ===
The triratna, a symbol of the Three Jewels

Three Jewels

- Buddha — Gautama Buddha, the Blessed One, the Awakened One, the Teacher
  - Accomplished (arahaṃ • arhat)
  - Fully enlightened (sammā-sambuddho • samyak-saṃbuddha)
  - Perfect in true knowledge and conduct (vijjā-caraṇa sampanno • vidyā-caraṇa-saṃpanna)
  - Sublime (sugato • sugata)
  - Knower of the worlds (lokavidū • loka-vid)
  - Incomparable leader of persons to be tamed (anuttaro purisa-damma-sārathi • puruṣa-damya-sārathi)
  - Teacher of devas and humans (satthā deva-manussānaṃ • śāsta deva-manuṣyāṇaṃ)
  - The Enlightened One (buddho)
  - The Blessed One (bhagavā • bhagavat)
- Dhamma (Dharma) — the cosmic principle of truth, lawfulness, and virtue discovered, fathomed, and taught by the Buddha; the Buddha's teaching as an expression of that principle; the teaching that leads to enlightenment and liberation
  - Well expounded by the Blessed One (svākkhāto bhagavatā dhammo • svākhyāta)
  - Directly visible (sandiṭṭhiko • sāṃdṛṣṭika)
  - Immediate (akāliko • akālika)
  - Inviting one to come and see (ehi-passiko • ehipaśyika)
  - Worthy of application (opanayiko • avapraṇayika)
  - To be personally experienced by the wise (paccattaṃ veditabbo viññūhi • pratyātmaṃ veditavyo vijñaiḥ)
- Saṅgha (Saṃgha) — the spiritual community, which is twofold (1) the monastic Saṅgha, the order of monks and nuns; and (2) the noble Saṅgha, the spiritual community of noble disciples who have reached the stages of world-transcending realization
  - Practicing the good way (supaṭipanno bhagavato sāvaka-saṅgho)
  - Practicing the straight way (ujupaṭipanno bhagavato sāvaka-saṅgho)
  - Practicing the true way (ñāyapaṭipanno bhagavato sāvaka-saṅgho)
  - Practicing the proper way (sāmīcipaṭipanno bhagavato sāvaka-saṅgho)
  - Worthy of gifts (āhuṇeyyo)
  - Worthy of hospitality (pāhuṇeyyo)
  - Worthy of offerings (dakkhiṇeyyo)
  - Worthy of reverential salutation (añjalikaraṇīyo)
  - The unsurpassed field of merit for the world (anuttaraṃ puññākkhettaṃ lokassā)

=== Four Noble Truths (Cattāri ariyasaccāni • Catvāri āryasatyāni) ===
Four Noble Truths

==== 1. The Noble Truth of Suffering (Dukkha ariya sacca) ====
- Suffering (dukkha • duḥkha) — to be fully understood (pariññeyya)
  - Dukkha as intrinsic suffering, as bodily or mental pain (dukkha-dukkha)
    - birth (jāti)
    - old age (jarā)
    - illness (byādhi)
    - death (maraṇa)
    - sorrow (soka)
    - lamentation (parideva)
    - pain (dukkha)
    - grief (domanassa)
    - despair (upāyāsā)
  - Dukkha due to change (vipariṇāma-dukkha)
    - Association with the unpleasant (appiyehi sampayogo)
    - Separation from the pleasant (piyehi vippayogo)
    - Not to get what one wants (yampicchaṃ na labhati tampi)
  - Dukkha of conditioned formations (saṅkhāra-dukkha)
    - Five aggregates of clinging (pañcupādānakkhandha)
      - material form (rūpa)
      - feeling (vedanā)
      - perception (saññā • samjñā)
      - mental formations (saṅkhāra • samskāra)
      - consciousness (viññāṇa • vijñāna)

==== 2. The Noble Truth of the Origin of Suffering (Dukkha samudaya ariya sacca) ====
- Craving (taṇhā • tṛṣṇā) (samudaya) — to be abandoned (pahātabba)
  - Craving for sensual pleasures (kāma taṇhā)
  - Craving for existence (bhava taṇhā)
  - Craving for non-existence (vibhava taṇhā)

==== 3. The Noble Truth of the Cessation of Suffering (Dukkha nirodha ariya sacca) ====
- Nirvana (Nibbāna • Nirvāṇa) (nirodha) — to be realized (sacchikātabba)
  - Nibbāna element with residue remaining (sa-upādisesa nibbānadhātu • sopadhiśeṣa-nirvāṇa)
  - Nibbāna element with no residue remaining (anupādisesa nibbānadhātu • nir-upadhiśeṣa-nirvāṇa) — Parinirvana (parinibbāna • parinirvāṇa)

==== 4. The Noble Truth of the Path of Practice leading to the Cessation of Suffering (Dukkha nirodha gāminī paṭipadā ariya sacca) ====
- Noble Eightfold Path (Ariyo aṭṭhaṅgiko maggo • Ārya 'ṣṭāṅga mārgaḥ) — to be developed (bhāvetabba)
  - Right view
  - Right intention
  - Right speech
  - Right action
  - Right livelihood
  - Right effort
  - Right mindfulness
  - Right concentration

=== Three Characteristics of Existence (Tilakkhaṇa • Trilakṣaṇa) ===
Three marks of existence

- Impermanence (anicca • anitya)
- Suffering (dukkha • duḥkha)
- Nonself (anattā • anātman)

=== Five Aggregates (Pañca khandha • Pañca-skandha) ===
Skandha

- Matter (Form) (rūpa)
  - Four Great Elements (mahābhūta)
    - Earth element (paṭhavī-dhātu)
    - Water (or liquid) element (āpo-dhātu)
    - Fire (or heat) element (tejo-dhātu)
    - Air (or wind) element (vāyo-dhātu)
- Feeling (vedanā)
  - Pleasant feeling (sukha)
  - Painful feeling (dukkha • duḥkha)
  - Neither-painful-nor-pleasant (neutral) feeling (adukkham-asukhā)
- Perception (saññā • samjñā)
- Mental formations (saṅkhāra • samskāra) — see below
- Consciousness (viññāṇa • vijñāna)

=== Dependent Origination (Paticcasamuppāda • Pratītyasamutpāda) ===
==== This/that Conditionality (Idappaccayatā) ====
Describing the causal nature of everything in the universe, as expressed in the following formula:

When this is, that is. From the arising of this comes the arising of that. When this isn't, that isn't. From the cessation of this comes the cessation of that.	Imasmiṃ sati, idaṃ hoti. Imass’ uppādā, idaṃ uppajjati. Imasmiṃ asati, idaṃ na hoti. Imassa nirodhā, idhaṃ nirujjhati.

==== Twelve Links (Nidāna) ====
Describes how suffering arises.

- Ignorance (avijjā • avidyā)
  - Not knowing suffering
  - Not knowing the origin of suffering
  - Not knowing the cessation of suffering
  - Not knowing the way leading to the cessation of suffering
- Volitional formations (saṅkhāra • saṃskāra)
  - Bodily formation
  - Verbal formation
  - Mental formation
- Consciousness (viññāṇa • vijñāna)
  - Eye-consciousness
  - Ear-consciousness
  - Nose-consciousness
  - Tongue-consciousness
  - Body-consciousness
  - Mind-consciousness
- Mind and body (nāmarūpa)
  - Mind (nāma)
    - Feeling (vedanā)
    - Perception (saññā • samjñā)
    - Volition (cetanā)
    - Contact (phassa)
    - Attention (manasikāra)
  - Body/materiality/form (rūpa)
    - Four Great Elements
      - Earth — solidity
      - Water — fluidity
      - Fire — heat
      - Wind — oscillation
- Six sense bases (saḷāyatana • ṣaḍāyatana)
  - Eye-base
  - Ear-base
  - Nose-base
  - Tongue-base
  - Body-base
  - Mind-base
- Contact (phassa • sparśa)
  - Eye-contact
  - Ear-contact
  - Nose-contact
  - Tongue-contact
  - Body-contact
  - Mind-contact
- Feeling (vedanā)
  - Feeling born of eye-contact
  - Feeling born of ear-contact
  - Feeling born of nose-contact
  - Feeling born of tongue-contact
  - Feeling born of body-contact
  - Feeling born of mind-contact
- Craving (taṇhā • tṛṣṇā)
  - Craving for forms
  - Craving for sounds
  - Craving for odors
  - Craving for flavors
  - Craving for tangibles
  - Craving for mind-objects
- Clinging (upādāna)
  - Clinging to sensual pleasures (kāmupādāna)
  - Clinging to views (diṭṭhupādāna)
  - Clinging to rituals and observances (sīlabbatupādāna)
  - Clinging to a doctrine of self (attavādupādāna)
- Being (bhava)
  - Sense-sphere being
  - Fine-material being
  - Immaterial being
- Birth (jāti)
- Old age and death (jarāmaraṇa)

==== Transcendental Dependent Origination ====
Describes the path out of suffering.

- Suffering (dukkha • duḥkha)
- Faith (saddhā • śraddhā)
- Joy (pāmojja)
- Rapture (pīti • prīti)
- Tranquillity (passaddhi)
- Happiness (sukha)
- Concentration (samādhi)
- Knowledge and vision of things as they really are (yathābhūta-ñāna-dassana)
- Disenchantment with worldly life (nibbidā)
- Dispassion (virāga)
- Freedom (vimutti)
- Knowledge of destruction of the taints (āsava-khaye-ñāna)

=== Karma (Kamma) ===
Karma in Buddhism

- Definition — volitional action, considered particularly as a moral force capable of producing, for the agent, results that correspond to the ethical quality of the action; thus good karma produces happiness, and bad karma produces suffering
- Result of karma (vipāka)
- Intention (cetanā)
  - Wholesome intention (kusala)
  - Unwholesome intention (akusala)
- Three doors of action (kammadvara)
  - Body — Bodily acts
  - Speech — Verbal acts
  - Mind — Mental acts
- Roots (mula)
  - Unwholesome
    - Greed (lobha • raga)
    - Hatred (dosa • dvesha)
    - Delusion (moha)
  - Wholesome
    - Nongreed (alobha) — renunciation, detachment, generosity
    - Nonhatred (adosa) — loving-kindness, sympathy, gentleness
    - Nondelusion (amoha) — wisdom
- Courses of action (kammapatha)
  - Unwholesome
    - Bodily
      - Destroying life
      - Taking what is not given
      - Wrong conduct in regard to sense pleasures
    - Verbal
      - False speech
      - Slanderous speech
      - Harsh speech
      - Idle chatter
    - Mental
      - Covetousness
      - Ill will
      - Wrong view
  - Wholesome
    - Bodily
      - Abstaining from destroying life
      - Abstaining from taking what is not given
      - Abstaining from wrong conduct in regard to sense pleasures
    - Verbal
      - Abstaining from false speech
      - Abstaining from slanderous speech
      - Abstaining from harsh speech
      - Abstaining from idle chatter
    - Mental
      - Being free from covetousness
      - Being free from ill will
      - Holding right view
- Function
  - Reproductive kamma (janaka kamma) — that which produces mental aggregates and material aggregates at the moment of conception
  - Supportive kamma (upatthambhaka kamma) — that which comes near the Reproductive Kamma and supports it
  - Obstructive kamma (upapiḍaka kamma) — that which tends to weaken, interrupt and retard the fruition of the Reproductive Kamma
  - Destructive kamma (upaghātaka kamma) — that which not only obstructs but also destroys the whole force of the Reproductive Kamma
- Order to take effect
  - Weighty kamma (garuka kamma) — that which produces its results in this life or in the next for certain
    - Five heinous crimes, causing rebirth in hell immediately after death (ānantarika-kamma)
      - Intentionally killing one's father (patricide)
      - Intentionally killing one's mother (matricide)
      - Intentionally killing an arahant
      - Maliciously causing blood to flow from the body of a Buddha
      - Creating a schism in the sangha
  - Proximate kamma (āsanna kamma) — that which one does or remembers immediately before the dying moment
  - Habitual kamma (āciṇṇa kamma) — that which one habitually performs and recollects and for which one has a great liking
  - Reserve kamma (kaṭattā kamma) — refers to all actions that are done once and soon forgotten
- Time of taking effect
  - Immediately effective kamma (diţţhadhammavedaniya kamma)
  - Subsequently, effective kamma (upapajjavedaniya kamma)
  - Indefinitely effective kamma (aṗarāpariyavedaniya kamma)
  - Defunct kamma (ahosi kamma)
- Place of taking effect
  - Immoral (akusala) kamma pertaining to the sense-sphere (kamavacara)
  - Moral (kusala) kamma pertaining to the sense-sphere (kamavacara)
  - Moral kamma pertaining to the form-sphere (rupavacara)
  - Moral kamma pertaining to the formless-sphere (arupavacara)
- Niyama Dhammas
  - Utu Niyama — Physical Inorganic Order (seasonal changes and climate), the natural law pertaining to physical objects and changes in the natural environment, such as the weather; the way flowers bloom in the day and fold up at night; the way soil, water and nutrients help a tree to grow; and the way things disintegrate and decompose. This perspective emphasizes the changes brought about by heat or temperature
  - Bīja Niyama — Physical Organic Order (laws of heredity), the natural law pertaining to heredity, which is best described in the adage, "as the seed, so the fruit”
  - Citta Niyama — Order of Mind and Psychic Law (will of mind), the natural law pertaining to the workings of the mind, the process of cognition of sense objects and the mental reactions to them
  - Kamma Niyama — Order of Acts and Results (consequences of one's actions), the natural law pertaining to human behavior, the process of the generation of action and its results. In essence, this is summarized in the words, "good deeds bring good results, bad deeds bring bad results”
  - Dhamma Niyama — Order of the Norm (nature's tendency to produce a perfect type), the natural law governing the relationship and interdependence of all things: the way all things arise, exist and then cease. All conditions are subject to change, are in a state of affliction and are not self: this is the Norm

=== Rebirth (Punabbhava • Punarbhava) ===
- Saṃsāra — Lit., the "wandering," the round of rebirths without discoverable beginning, sustained by ignorance and craving

==== Buddhist cosmology ====
Buddhist cosmology

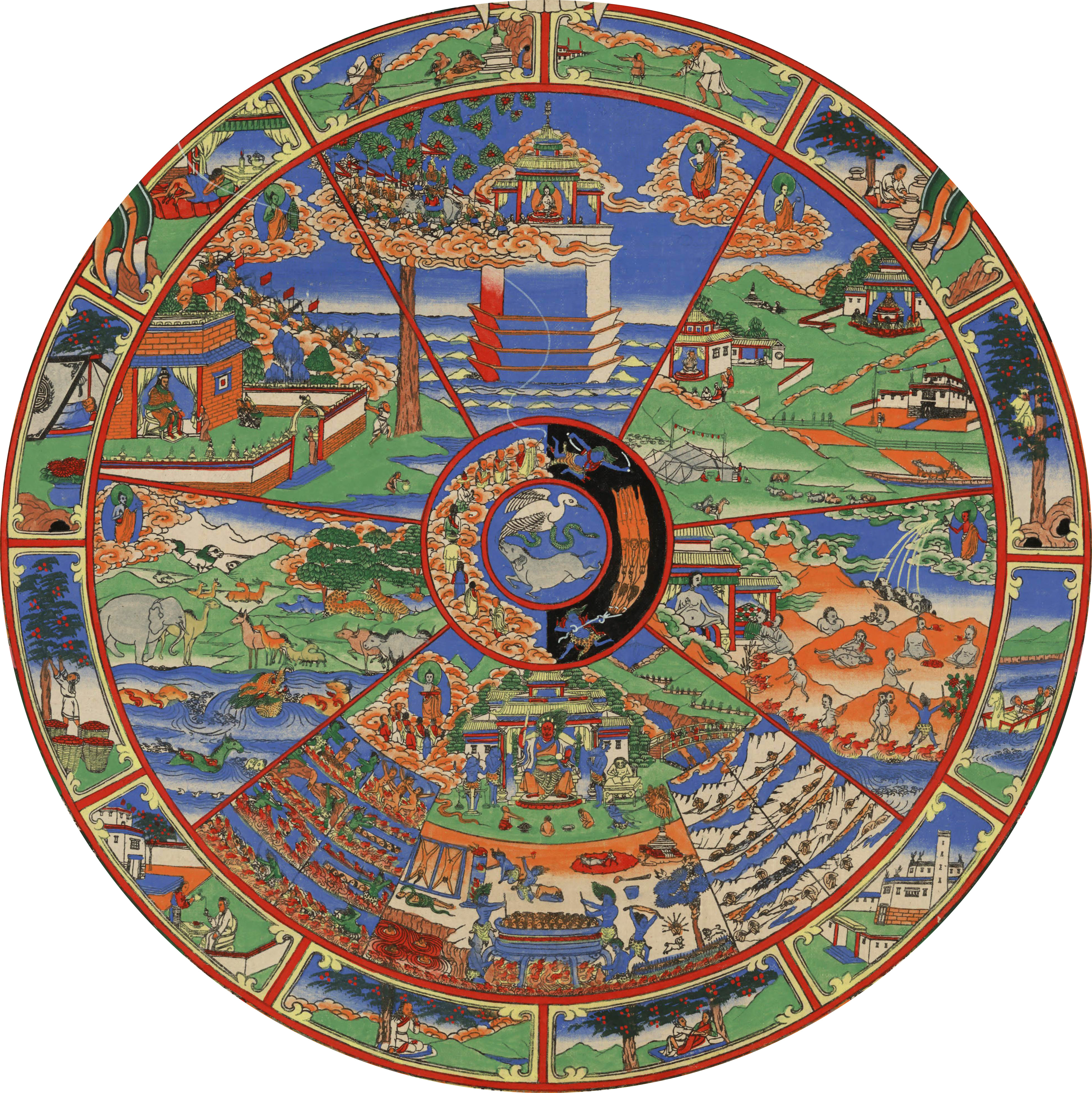
The bhavachakra, a symbolic depiction of the six realms.

- Six realms
  - Heaven (sagga)
    - Tusita — one of the six deva-worlds of the kāmadhātu
    - Tāvatiṃsa — the fifth of the heavens of the kāmadhātu, and the highest of the heavens that maintains a physical connection with the rest of the world
    - Four Heavenly Kings
  - Demigod realm (asura)
  - Human realm (mānusatta)
  - Hungry Ghost realm (peta • preta)
  - Animal realm
  - Hell (niraya • naraka)
    - Avīci — the lowest level of the hell realm
- Three planes of existence (tiloka • triloka)
  - World of desire (kāmaloka)
  - World of form (rūpaloka)
  - World of formlessness (arūpaloka)
- Ten spiritual realms
  - Buddhahood
  - Bodhisattva — Bodhisattvahood
  - Pratyekabuddha — Realization
  - Sāvakabuddha — Learning
  - Deva — Heaven
  - Asura — Paranoid jealousy
  - Human beings in Buddhism — Humanity
  - Animals in Buddhism — Animality
  - Preta — Hunger
  - Naraka — Hell

=== Sense bases (Āyatana) ===
Ayatana

- Six sense bases (saḷāyatana • ṣaḍāyatana)
  - eye (cakkhu) and Forms
  - Ear (sota) and Sounds
  - nose (ghāṇa) and Odors
  - Tongue (jivhā) and Flavors
  - Body (kāya) and Tactile objects
  - Mind (mano) and Phenomena

=== Six Great Elements (Dhātu) ===
- Earth element (paṭhavī-dhātu)
- Water (or liquid) element (āpo-dhātu)
- Fire element (tejo-dhātu)
- Air (or wind) element (vāyo-dhātu)
- Space element (ākāsa-dhātu)
- Consciousness element (viññāṇa-dhātu)

=== Faculties (Indriya) ===
Indriya

- Six sensory faculties
  - Eye/vision faculty (cakkh-undriya)
  - Ear/hearing faculty (sot-indriya)
  - Nose/smell faculty (ghān-indriya)
  - Tongue/taste faculty (jivh-indriya)
  - Body/sensibility faculty (kāy-indriya)
  - Mind faculty (man-indriya)
- Three physical faculties
  - Femininity (itth-indriya)
  - Masculinity (puris-indriya)
  - Life or vitality (jīvit-indriya)
- Five feeling faculties
  - Physical pleasure (sukh-indriya)
  - Physical pain (dukkh-indriya)
  - Mental joy (somanasa-indriya)
  - Mental grief (domanass-indriya)
  - Indifference (upekh-indriya)
- Five spiritual faculties
  - Faith (saddh-indriya)
  - Energy (viriy-indriya)
  - Mindfulness (sat-indriya)
  - Concentration (samādhi-indriya)
  - Wisdom (paññ-indriya)
- Three final-knowledge faculties
  - Thinking "I shall know the unknown" (anaññāta-ñassāmīt-indriya)
  - Gnosis (aññ-indriya)
  - One who knows (aññātā-vindriya)

=== Mental Factors (Cetasika • Caitasika ) ===
==== Theravāda abhidhamma ====
- Seven universal mental factors common to all; ethically variable mental factors common to all consciousnesses (sabbacittasādhāraṇa cetasikas)
  - Contact (phassa)
  - Feeling (vedanā)
  - Perception (saññā)
  - Volition (cetanā)
  - One-pointedness (ekaggatā)
  - Life Faculty (jīvitindriya)
  - Attention (manasikāra)
- Six occasional or particular mental factors; ethically variable mental factors found only in certain consciousnesses (pakiṇṇaka cetasikas)
  - Application of thought (vitakka)
  - Examining (vicāra)
  - Decision (adhimokkha)
  - Energy (viriya)
  - Rapture (pīti)
  - Wholesome desire (chanda)
- Fourteen unwholesome mental factors (akusala cetasikas)
  - Four universal unwholesome mental factors (akusalasādhāraṇa):
    - Delusion (moha)
    - Lack of shame (ahirika)
    - Disregard for consequence (anottappa)
    - Restlessness (uddhacca)
  - Three mental factors of the greed-group (lobha):
    - Greed (lobha)
    - Wrong view (diṭṭhi)
    - Conceit (māna)
  - Four mental factors of the hatred-group (dosa)
    - Hatred (dosa)
    - Envy (issā)
    - Miserliness (macchariya)
    - Regret (kukkucca)
  - Other unwholesome mental factors
    - Sloth (thīna)
    - Torpor (middha)
    - Doubt (vicikicchā)
- Twenty-five beautiful mental factors (sobhana cetasikas)
  - Nineteen universal beautiful mental factors (sobhanasādhāraṇa):
    - Faith (saddhā)
    - Mindfulness (sati)
    - Shame at doing evil (hiri)
    - Regard for consequence (ottappa)
    - Lack of greed (alobha)
    - Lack of hatred (adosa)
    - Balance, neutrality of mind (tatramajjhattatā)
    - Tranquillity of mental body (kāyapassaddhi)
    - Tranquillity of consciousness (cittapassaddhi)
    - Lightness of mental body (kāyalahutā)
    - Lightness of consciousness (cittalahutā)
    - Softness/malleability of mental body (kāyamudutā)
    - Softness/malleability of consciousness (cittamudutā)
    - Readiness/wieldiness of mental body (kāyakammaññatā)
    - Readiness/wieldiness of consciousness (cittakammaññatā)
    - Proficiency of mental body (kāyapāguññatā)
    - Proficiency of consciousness (cittapāguññatā)
    - Straightness/rectitude of mental body (kāyujukatā)
    - Straightness/rectitude of consciousness (cittujukatā)
  - Three Abstinences (virati):
    - Right speech (sammāvācā)
    - Right action (sammākammanta)
    - Right livelihood (sammā-ājīva)
  - Two Illimitables (appamañña):
    - Compassion (karuṇā)
    - Sympathetic joy (muditā)
  - One Faculty of wisdom (paññindriya):
    - Wisdom (paññā • prajñā)

==== Mahayana abhidharma ====
- Five universal mental factors (sarvatraga) common to all:
1. Sparśa — contact, contacting awareness, sense impression, touch
2. Vedanā — feeling, sensation
3. Saṃjñā — perception
4. Cetanā — volition
5. Manasikara — attention
- Five determining mental factors (viṣayaniyata):
1. Chanda — desire (to act), intention, interest
2. Adhimoksha — decision, interest, firm conviction
3. Smṛti — mindfulness
4. Prajñā — wisdom
5. Samādhi — concentration
- Eleven virtuous (kuśala) mental factors
1. Sraddhā — faith
2. Hrī — self-respect, conscientiousness, sense of shame
3. Apatrāpya — decorum, regard for consequence
4. Alobha — non-attachment
5. Adveṣa — non-aggression, equanimity, lack of hatred
6. Amoha — non-bewilderment
7. Vīrya — diligence, effort
8. Praśrabdhi — pliancy
9. Apramāda — conscientiousness
10. Upekṣa — equanimity
11. Ahiṃsā — nonharmfulness
- Six root mental defilements (mūlakleśa):
1. Raga — attachment
2. Pratigha — anger
3. Avidya — ignorance
4. Māna — pride, conceit
5. Vicikitsa — doubt
6. Dṛiṣṭi — wrong view
- Twenty secondary defilement (upakleśa):
1. Krodha — rage, fury
2. Upanāha — resentment
3. Mrakśa — concealment, slyness-concealment
4. Pradāśa — spitefulness
5. Irshya — envy, jealousy
6. Mātsarya — stinginess, avarice, miserliness
7. Māyā — pretense, deceit
8. Śāṭhya — hypocrisy, dishonesty
9. Mada — self-infatuation, mental inflation, self-satisfaction
10. Vihiṃsā — malice, hostility, cruelty, intention to harm
11. Āhrīkya — lack of shame, lack of conscious, shamelessness
12. Anapatrāpya — lack of propriety, disregard, shamelessness
13. Styāna — lethargy, gloominess
14. Auddhatya — excitement, ebullience
15. Āśraddhya — lack of faith, lack of trust
16. Kausīdya — laziness, slothfulness
17. Pramāda — heedlessness, carelessness, unconcern
18. Muṣitasmṛtitā — forgetfulness
19. Asaṃprajanya — non-alertness, inattentiveness
20. Vikṣepa — distraction, desultoriness
- Four changeable mental factors (aniyata):
1. Kaukṛitya — regret, worry,
2. Middha — sleep, drowsiness
3. Vitarka — conception, selectiveness, examination
4. Vicāra — discernment, discursiveness, analysis

=== Mind and Consciousness ===
- Citta — Mind, mindset, or state of mind
- Cetasika — Mental factors
- Manas — Mind, general thinking faculty
- Consciousness (viññāṇa)
- Mindstream (citta-saṃtāna) — the moment-to-moment continuity of consciousness
- Bhavanga — the most fundamental aspect of mind in Theravada
- Luminous mind (pabhassara citta)
- Consciousness-only (vijñapti-mātratā)
- Eight Consciousnesses (aṣṭavijñāna)
  - Eye-consciousness – seeing apprehended by the visual sense organs
  - Ear-consciousness – hearing apprehended by the auditory sense organs
  - Nose-consciousness – smelling apprehended through the olfactory organs
  - Tongue-consciousness – tasting perceived through the gustatory organs
  - Ideation-consciousness – the aspect of mind known in Sanskrit as the "mind monkey"; the consciousness of ideation
  - Body-consciousness – tactile feeling apprehended through skin contact, touch
  - The manas consciousness – obscuration-consciousness – a consciousness which through apprehension, gathers the hindrances, the poisons, the karmic formations
  - Store-house consciousness (ālāyavijñāna) — the seed consciousness, the consciousness which is the basis of the other seven
- Mental proliferation (papañca • prapañca) — the deluded conceptualization of the world through the use of ever-expanding language and concepts
- Monkey mind — unsettled, restless mind

=== Obstacles to Enlightenment ===
- Taints (āsava)
  - Sensual desire (kāmāsava)
  - Becoming (bhavāsava)
  - Wrong view (diṭṭhāsava)
  - Ignorance (avijjāsava)
- Defilements (kilesa • kleśā)
  - Three defilements
    - Greed (lobha • rāga)
    - Hatred (aversion) (dosa • dvesha)
    - Delusion (moha)
  - Round of defilements (kilesa-vaṭṭa)
    - Ignorance (avijjā • avidyā)
    - Craving (taṇhā • tṛṣṇā)
    - Clinging (upādāna)
- Four perversions of view, thought and perception (vipallasa)
  - Taking what is impermanent (anicca • anitya) to be permanent (nicca • nitya)
  - Taking what is suffering (dukkha • duḥkha) to be happiness (sukha)
  - Taking what is nonself (anattā • anātman) to be self (attā • ātman)
  - Taking what is not beautiful (asubha) to be beautiful (subha)
- Five hindrances (pañca nīvaraṇā) — the main inner impediments to the development of concentration and insight
  - Sensual desire (kāmacchanda) — craving for pleasure to the senses
  - Ill-will (vyāpāda) — feelings of malice directed toward others
  - Sloth and torpor (thīna-middha) — half-hearted action with little or no energy
  - Restlessness and remorse (uddhacca-kukkucca) — the inability to calm the mind
  - Doubt (vicikicchā) — lack of conviction or trust
- Latent tendencies (anusaya)
  - Sensual passion (kāma-rāga)
  - Resistance (patigha)
  - Views (diṭṭhi)
  - Doubt (vicikicchā)
  - Conceit (māna)
  - Craving for continued existence (bhavarāga)
  - Ignorance (avijjā • avidyā)
- Ten Fetters (saṃyojana)
  - Identity view (sakkāyadiṭṭhi) — the view of a truly existent self either as identical with the five aggregates, or as existing in some relation to them
    - Eternity-belief (sassata-diṭṭhi)
    - Annihilation-belief (uccheda-diṭṭhi)
  - Doubt (vicikicchā) — doubt about the Buddha, the Dhamma, the Saṅgha, or the training
  - Wrong grasp of rules and observances (sīlabbata-parāmāsa) — the belief that mere external observances, particularly religious rituals and ascetic practices, can lead to liberation
  - Sensual lust (kāmacchando)
  - Ill will (vyāpādo)
  - Desire for existence in the form realm (rūparāgo)
  - Desire for existence in the formless realm (arūparāgo)
  - Conceit (māna)
  - Restlessness (uddhacca)
  - Ignorance (avijjā • avidyā)

=== Two Kinds of Happiness (Sukha) ===
- Bodily pleasure (kayasukha)
- Mental happiness (cittasukha)

=== Two Kinds of Bhava ===
- Kamma Bhava — kammas caused by four Upadanas
- Upapatti Bhava — rebirth bhava

=== Two Guardians of the World (Sukka lokapala) ===
- Shame at doing evil (hiri)
- Fear of the results of wrongdoing (ottappa)

=== Three Conceits ===
- "I am better"
- "I am equal"
- "I am worse"

=== Three Standpoints ===
- Gratification (assāda)
- Danger (ādinava)
- Escape (nissaraṇa)

=== Three Primary Aims ===
- Welfare and happiness directly visible in this present life, attained by fulfilling one's moral commitments and social responsibilities (diṭṭha-dhamma-hitasukha)
- Welfare and happiness pertaining to the next life, attained by engaging in meritorious deeds (samparāyika-hitasukha)
- The ultimate good or supreme goal, Nibbāna, final release from the cycle of rebirths, attained by developing the Noble Eightfold Path (paramattha)

=== Three Divisions of the Dharma ===
- Study (pariyatti)
- Practice (paṭipatti)
- Realization (pativedha)

=== Four Kinds of Nutriment ===
- Physical food [either gross or subtle] (kabalinkaro)
- Contact (phasso dutiyo)
- Mental volition (manosancetana)
- Consciousness (viññāṇa • vijñāna)

=== Four Kinds of Acquisitions (Upadhi) ===
- The Five Aggregates (khandha • skandha)
- Defilements (kilesa • kleśā)
- Volitional formations (saṅkhāra • saṃskāra)
- Sensual pleasures (kāmacchanda)

=== Eight Worldly Conditions ===
The "Eight Worldly Winds" referenced in discussions of Equanimity (upekkhā, upekṣhā)

- Pleasure and pain
- Praise and blame
- Honour and dishonour
- Gain and loss

=== Truth (Sacca • Satya) ===
- Four Noble Truths (cattāri ariyasaccāni • catvāri āryasatyāni)
  - Suffering (dukkha • duḥkha)
  - Cause of suffering (samudaya)
  - Cessation of suffering (nirodha)
  - Path leading to the cessation of suffering (magga • marga)
- Two truths doctrine
  - Conventional truth (sammutisacca • saṃvṛtisatya)
  - Ultimate truth (paramatthasacca • paramārthasatya)

=== Higher Knowledge (Abhiññā • Abhijñā) ===
Abhijñā

- Six types of higher knowledges (chalabhiñña)
  - Supernormal powers (iddhi)
    - Multiplying the body into many and into one again
    - Appearing and vanishing at will
    - Passing through solid objects as if space
    - Ability to rise and sink in the ground as if in water
    - Walking on water as if land
    - Flying through the skies
    - Touching anything at any distance (even the moon or sun)
    - Traveling to other worlds (like the world of Brahma) with or without the body
  - Divine ear (dibba-sota), that is, clairaudience
  - Mind-penetrating knowledge (ceto-pariya-ñāṇa), that is, telepathy
  - Remembering one's former abodes (pubbe-nivāsanussati), that is, recalling one's own past lives
  - Divine eye (dibba-cakkhu), that is, knowing others' karmic destinations
  - Extinction of mental intoxicants (āsavakkhaya), upon which arahantship follows
- Three knowledges (tevijja)
  - Remembering one's former abodes (pubbe-nivāsanussati)
  - Divine eye (dibba-cakkhu)
  - Extinction of mental intoxicants (āsavakkhaya)

=== Great fruits of the contemplative life (Maha-Phala) ===
Phala

- Equanimity (upekkhā, upekṣhā)
- Fearlessness (nibbhaya)
- Freedom from unhappiness & suffering (asukhacaadukkha)
- Meditative Absorption (samādhi)
- Out-of-body experience (manomaya)
- Clairaudience (dibba-sota)
- Intuition and mental telepathy (ceto-pariya-ñána)
- Recollection of past lives (patisandhi)
- Clairvoyance (dibba-cakkhu)
- The Ending of Mental Fermentations (samatha)

=== Concepts unique to Mahayana and Vajrayana ===
White A – Symbol Dzogchen

- Bardo — Intermediate state
  - Shinay bardo – the Bardo of This Life
  - Milam bardo – the Bardo of Dream
  - Samten bardo – the Bardo of Meditation
  - Chikkhai bardo – the Bardo of Dying
  - Chönyid bardo – the Bardo of Dharmata
  - Sidpai bardo – the Bardo of Existence
- Bodhicitta — the wish to attain Buddhahood
- Bodhisattva — name given to anyone who has generated bodhicitta
- Buddha-nature — immortal potency or element within the purest depths of the mind, present in all sentient beings, for awakening and becoming a Buddha
- Dzogchen — the natural, primordial state or natural condition of every sentient being
- Eternal Buddha
- Lung (Tibetan Buddhism)
- Pure land
- Rainbow body — a body not made of flesh, but consists of pure light, an astral body
- Svabhava — Intrinsic nature
- Tathātā/Dharmatā — Thusness
  - Dharmadhatu — Realm of Truth
    - Four Dharmadhātu
- Terma
- Three Roots
  - Lama
  - Iṣṭha-deva(tā) — Yidam
  - Dakini/Dharmapala
- Trikaya
  - Nirmanakaya
  - Sambhogakaya
  - Dharmakāya
- Upāya — Skillful means
  - Five Wisdoms

=== Other concepts ===
- Emptiness (suññatā • śūnyatā)
- Middle Way (majjhimā paṭipadā • madhyamā-pratipad) — the Buddhist path of non-extremism
  - Avoiding the extreme of sensual indulgence (kāmesu kāma-sukha-allika)
  - Avoiding the extreme of self-mortification (atta-kilamatha)
- Sentient beings (satta • sattva)

== Buddhist practices ==
=== Buddhist devotion ===
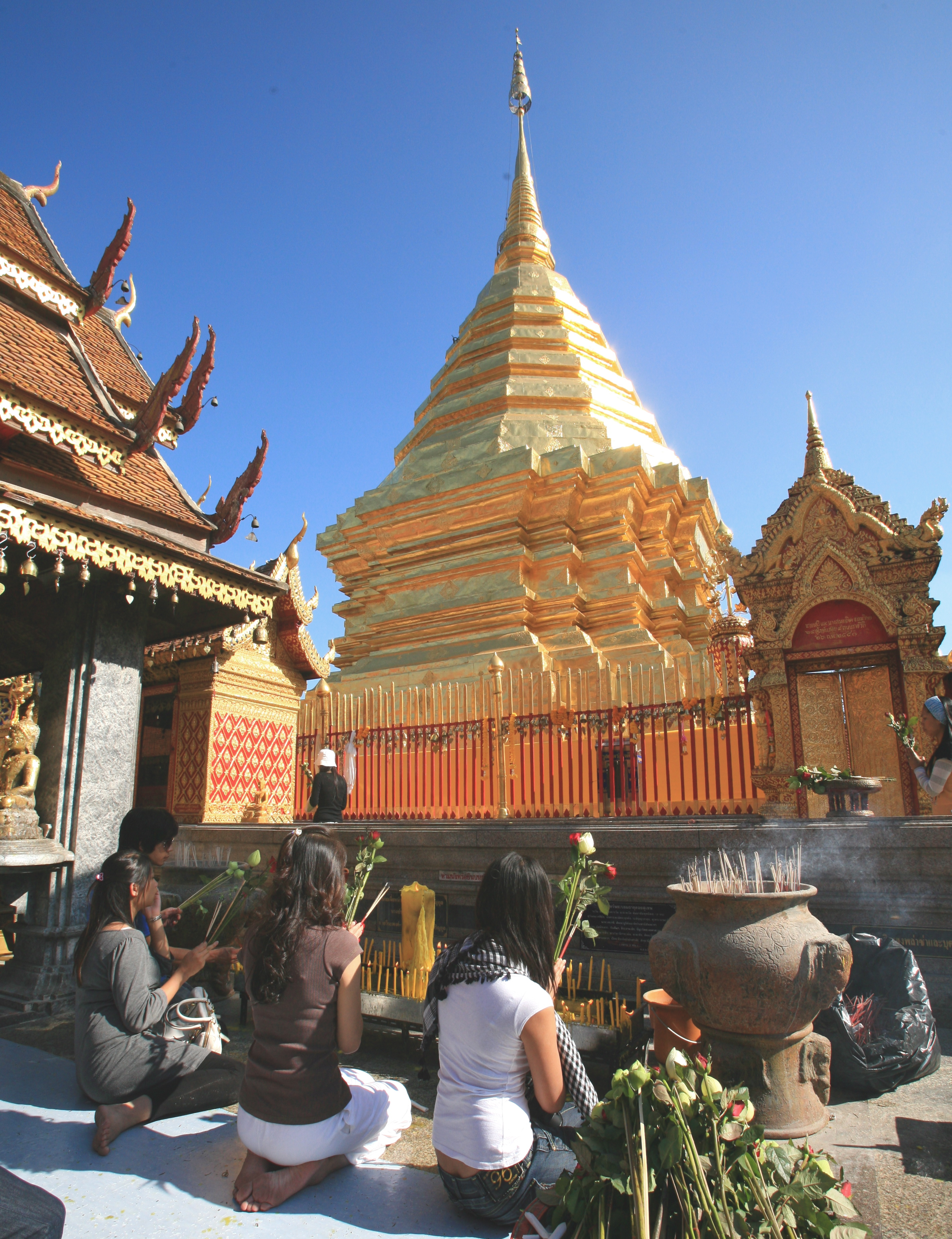
Buddhists making offerings at Wat Phrathat Doi Suthep

Buddhist devotion

- Taking refuge in the Triple Gem
  - Buddha
  - Dharma
  - Sangha
- Worship (pūjā) — see also: Abhisheka
  - Offerings
  - Prostration (panipāta • namas-kara)
  - Chanting
    - Mantra
      - Om mani padme hum
      - Namo Amituofo
      - Nam Myōhō Renge Kyō
      - Buddho
      - Namo tassa bhagavato arahato sammāsambuddhassa — Homage to the Blessed One, the Worthy One, the Fully Self-enlightened One

=== Moral discipline and precepts (Sīla • Śīla) ===
- Five Precepts (pañca-sīlāni • pañca-śīlāni)
  - Abstaining from taking life (pāṇātipātā veramaṇī)
  - Abstaining from taking what is not given (adinnādānā veramaṇī)
  - Abstaining from sexual misconduct (kāmesu micchācāra veramaṇī)
  - Abstaining from false speech (musāvāda veramaṇī)
  - Abstaining from drinks and drugs that cause heedlessness (surā-meraya-majja-pamādaṭṭhānā veramaṇī)
- Eight Precepts (aṭṭhasīla)
  - Abstaining from taking life (both human and non-human)
  - Abstaining from taking what is not given (stealing)
  - Abstaining from all sexual activity
  - Abstaining from telling lies
  - Abstaining from using intoxicating drinks and drugs which lead to carelessness
  - Abstaining from eating at the wrong time (the right time is eating once, after sunrise, before noon)
  - Abstaining from singing, dancing, playing music, attending entertainment performances, wearing perfume, and using cosmetics and garlands (decorative accessories)
  - Abstaining from luxurious places for sitting or sleeping
- Ten Precepts (dasasīla)
  - Abstaining from killing living things
  - Abstaining from stealing
  - Abstaining from un-chastity (sensuality, sexuality, lust)
  - Abstaining from lying
  - Abstaining from taking intoxicants
  - Abstaining from taking food at inappropriate times (after noon)
  - Abstaining from singing, dancing, playing music or attending entertainment programs (performances)
  - Abstaining from wearing perfume, cosmetics and garland (decorative accessories)
  - Abstaining from sitting on high chairs and sleeping on luxurious, soft beds
  - Abstaining from accepting money
- Sixteen Precepts
  - Three Treasures
    - Taking refuge in the Buddha
    - Taking refuge in the Dharma
    - Taking refuge in the Sangha
  - Three Pure Precepts
    - Not Creating Evil
    - Practicing Good
    - Actualizing Good For Others
  - Ten Grave Precepts
    - Affirm life; Do not kill
    - Be giving; Do not steal
    - Honor the body; Do not misuse sexuality
    - Manifest truth; Do not lie
    - Proceed clearly; Do not cloud the mind
    - See the perfection; Do not speak of others errors and faults
    - Realize self and other as one; Do not elevate the self and blame others
    - Give generously; Do not be withholding
    - Actualize harmony; Do not be angry
    - Experience the intimacy of things; Do not defile the Three Treasures
- Vinaya
  - Pātimokkha (Pratimoksha) — the code of monastic rules binding on members of the Buddhist monastic order
    - Parajika (defeats) — four rules entailing expulsion from the sangha for life
      - Sexual intercourse, that is, any voluntary sexual interaction between a bhikkhu and a living being, except for mouth-to-mouth intercourse which falls under the sanghadisesa
      - Stealing, that is, the robbery of anything worth more than 1/24 troy ounce of gold (as determined by local law.)
      - Intentionally bringing about the death of a human being, even if it is still an embryo — whether by killing the person, arranging for an assassin to kill the person, inciting the person to die, or describing the advantages of death
      - Deliberately lying to another person that one has attained a superior human state, such as claiming to be an arahant when one knows one is not, or claiming to have attained one of the jhanas when one knows one hasn't
    - Sanghadisesa — thirteen rules requiring an initial and subsequent meeting of the sangha (communal meetings)
    - Aniyata — two indefinite rules where a monk is accused of having committed an offence with a woman in a screened (enclosed) or private place by a lay person
    - Nissaggiya pacittiya — thirty rules entailing "confession with forfeiture"
    - Pacittiya — ninety-two rules entailing confession
    - Patidesaniya — four violations which must be verbally acknowledged
    - Sekhiyavatta — seventy-five rules of training, which are mainly about the deportment of a monk
      - Sāruppa — proper behavior
      - Bhojanapatisamyutta — food
      - Dhammadesanāpatisamyutta — teaching dhamma
      - Pakinnaka — miscellaneous
    - Adhikarana-samatha — seven rules for settlement of legal processes that concern monks only
- Bodhisattva vows
- Samaya — a set of vows or precepts given to initiates of an esoteric Vajrayana Buddhist order
- Ascetic practices (dhutanga) — a group of thirteen austerities, or ascetic practices, most commonly observed by Forest Monastics of the Theravada Tradition of Buddhism

=== Three Resolutions ===
- To abstain from all evil (sabbapāpassa akaraṇaṃ)
- To cultivate the good (kusalassa upasampadā)
- To purify one's mind (sacittapariyodapanaṃ)

=== Three Pillars of Dharma ===
- Generosity (dāna)
- Morality (sīla • śīla)
- Meditation (bhāvanā)

=== Threefold Training (Sikkhā) ===
Threefold Training

- The training in the higher moral discipline (adhisīla-sikkhā) — morality (sīla • śīla)
- The training in the higher mind (adhicitta-sikkhā) — concentration (samādhi)
- The training in the higher wisdom (adhipaññā-sikkhā) — wisdom (paññā • prajñā)

=== Five Qualities ===
- Faith (saddhā • śraddhā)
- Morality (sīla • śīla)
- Learning (suta)
- Generosity (cāga)
- Wisdom (paññā • prajñā)

=== Five Powers of a Trainee ===
- Faith (saddhā • śraddhā)
- Conscience (hiri) — an innate sense of shame over moral transgression
- Fear of wrong-doing (ottappa) — moral dread, fear of the results of wrongdoing
- Energy (viriya • vīrya)
- Wisdom (paññā • prajñā)

=== Five Things that lead to Enlightenment ===
- Admirable friendship (kalyāṇa-mittatā • kalyāṇa-mitratā)
- Morality (sīla • śīla)
- Hearing the Dhamma
- Exertion (viriya • vīrya)
- Awareness of impermanence (anicca-ñāṇa)

=== Five Subjects for Contemplation ===
Upajjhatthana Sutta

- I am subject to ageing, I am not exempt from ageing
- I am subject to illness, I am not exempt from illness
- I am subject to death, I am not exempt from death
- There will be change and separation from all that I hold dear and near to me
- I am the owner of my actions, heir to my actions, I am born of my actions, I am related to my actions and I have my actions as refuge; whatever I do, good or evil, of that I will be the heir

=== Gradual training (Anupubbikathā) ===
- Generosity (dāna)
- Virtue (sīla • śīla)
- Heaven (sagga)
- Danger of sensual pleasure (kāmānaṃ ādīnava)
- Renunciation (nekkhamma)
- The Four Noble Truths (cattāri ariyasaccāni • catvāri āryasatyāni)

=== Seven Good Qualities (Satta saddhammā) ===
- Faith (saddhā • śraddhā)
- Conscience (hiri)
- Moral dread (ottappa)
- Learning (suta)
- Energy (viriya • vīrya)
- Mindfulness (sati • smṛti)
- Wisdom (paññā • prajñā)

=== Ten Meritorious Deeds (Dasa Punnakiriya vatthu) ===
- Generosity (dāna)
- Morality (sīla • śīla)
- Meditation (bhāvanā)
- Paying due respect to those who are worthy of it (apacayana)
- Helping others perform good deeds (veyyavacca)
- Sharing of merit after doing some good deed (anumodana)
- Rejoicing in the merits of others (pattanumodana)
- Teaching the Dhamma (dhammadesana)
- Listening to the Dhamma (dhammassavana)
- Straightening one's own views (ditthujukamma)

=== Perfections (Pāramī • Pāramitā) ===
==== Ten Theravada Pāramīs (Dasa pāramiyo) ====
- Generosity (dāna)
- Morality (sīla)
- Renunciation (nekkhamma)
- Wisdom (paññā)
- Energy (virya)
- Patience (khanti)
- Truthfulness (sacca)
- Determination (adhiṭṭhāna)
- Loving-kindness (mettā)
- Equanimity (upekkhā)

==== Six Mahayana Pāramitās ====
- Generosity (dāna)
- Morality (śīla)
- Patience (kṣanti)
- Energy (vīrya)
- Concentration (dhyāna)
- Wisdom (prajñā)

=== States Pertaining to Enlightenment (Bodhipakkhiyādhammā • Bodhipakṣa dharma) ===
==== Four Foundations of Mindfulness (Cattāro satipaṭṭhānā • Smṛtyupasthāna) ====
Satipatthana

- Mindfulness of the body (kāyagatāsati • kāyasmṛti)
  - Mindfulness of breathing (ānāpānasati • ānāpānasmṛti)
    - Mindfulness of the body (kāyanupassana) — first tetrad
      - Breathing a long breath
      - Breathing a short breath
      - Experiencing the whole (breath-) body (awareness of the beginning, middle, and end of the breath)
      - Tranquilizing the bodily formation
    - Mindfulness of feelings (vedanānupassana) — second tetrad
      - Experiencing rapture
      - Experiencing bliss
      - Experiencing the mental formation
      - Tranquilizing the mental formation
    - Mindfulness of the mind (cittanupassana) — third tetrad
      - Experiencing the mind
      - Gladdening the mind
      - Concentrating the mind
      - Liberating the mind
    - Mindfulness of Dhammas (dhammānupassana) — fourth tetrad
      - Contemplating impermanence (aniccānupassī)
      - Contemplating fading away (virāgānupassī)
      - Contemplating cessation (nirodhānupassī)
      - Contemplating relinquishment (paṭinissaggānupassī)
  - Postures
    - Walking
    - Standing
    - Sitting
    - Lying down
  - Clear comprehension (sampajañña • samprajaña)
    - Clear comprehension of the purpose of one's action (sātthaka)
    - Clear comprehension of the suitability of one's means to the achievement of one's purpose (sappāya)
    - Clear comprehension of the domain, that is, not abandoning the subject of meditation during one's daily routine (gocara)
    - Clear comprehension of reality, the awareness that behind one's activities there is no abiding self (asammoha)
  - Reflections on repulsiveness of the body, meditation on the thirty-two body parts (patikulamanasikara)
    - head hairs
    - body hairs
    - nails
    - teeth
    - skin
    - flesh
    - tendons
    - bones
    - bone marrow
    - kidneys
    - heart
    - liver
    - pleura (or diaphragm)
    - spleen
    - lungs
    - intestines
    - mesentery
    - stomach
    - feces
    - bile
    - phlegm
    - pus
    - blood
    - sweat
    - fat
    - tears
    - skin-oil
    - saliva
    - mucus
    - synovial fluid
    - urine
    - brain
  - Reflections on the material elements (mahābhūta)
    - Earth
    - Water
    - Fire
    - Wind
  - Cemetery contemplations (asubha)
    - Swollen or bloated corpse
    - Corpse brownish black or purplish blue with decay
    - Festering or suppurated corpse
    - Corpse splattered half or fissured from decay
    - Corpse gnawed by animals such as wild dogs and foxes
    - Corpse scattered in parts, hands, legs, head and body being dispersed
    - Corpse cut and thrown away in parts after killing
    - Bleeding corpse, i.e. with red blood oozing out
    - Corpse infested with and eaten by worms
    - Remains of a corpse in a heap of bones, i.e. skeleton
- Mindfulness of feelings (vedanāsati • vedanāsmṛti)
  - Pleasant feeling
    - Worldly pleasant feeling
    - Spiritual pleasant feeling
  - Painful feeling
    - Worldly painful feeling
    - Spiritual painful feeling
  - Neither-pleasant-nor-painful (neutral) feeling
    - Worldly neutral feeling
    - Spiritual neutral feeling
- Mindfulness of the mind (cittasati • cittasmṛti)
  - With lust (sarāgaṃ) or without lust (vītarāgaṃ)
  - With hate (sadosaṃ) or without hate (vītadosaṃ)
  - With delusion (samohaṃ) or without delusion (vītamohaṃ)
  - Contracted (saṅkhittaṃ) or scattered (vikkhittaṃ)
  - Lofty (mahaggataṃ) or not lofty (amahaggataṃ)
  - Surpassable (sa-uttaraṃ) or unsurpassed (anuttaraṃ)
  - Quieted (samāhitaṃ) or not quieted (asamāhitaṃ)
  - Released (vimuttaṃ) or not released (avimuttaṃ)
- Mindfulness of mental phenomena (dhammāsati • dharmasmṛti)
  - Hindrances
  - Aggregates of clinging
  - Sense bases and their fetters
  - Seven factors of enlightenment
  - Four Noble Truths

==== Four Right Efforts (Cattārimāni sammappadhānāni • Samyak-pradhāna) ====
Four Right Exertions

- The effort to prevent the arising of unarisen unwholesome mental states (anuppādāya)
- The effort to abandon arisen unwholesome mental states (pahānāya)
- The effort to generate unarisen wholesome mental states (uppādāya)
- The effort to maintain and perfect arisen wholesome mental states (ṭhitiyā)

==== Four Roads to Mental Power (Iddhipāda • Ṛddhipāda) ====
Iddhipada

- Concentration due to desire (chanda)
- Concentration due to energy (viriya • vīrya)
- Concentration due to mind (citta)
- Concentration due to investigation (vīmaṃsā)

==== Five Spiritual Faculties (Pañca indriya) ====
Indriya

- Faith (saddhā • śraddhā) — faith in the Buddha's awakening
- Energy (viriya • vīrya) — exertion towards the Four Right Efforts
- Mindfulness (sati • smṛti) — focusing on the four satipatthana
- Concentration (samādhi) — achieving the four jhānas
- Wisdom (paññā • prajñā) — discerning the Four Noble Truths

==== Five Powers (Pañca bala) ====
Five Strengths

- Faith (saddhā • śraddhā) — controls doubt
- Energy (viriya • vīrya) — controls laziness
- Mindfulness (sati • smṛti) — controls heedlessness
- Concentration (samādhi) — controls distraction
- Wisdom (paññā • prajñā) — controls ignorance

==== Seven Factors of Enlightenment (Satta sambojjhaṅgā • Sapta bodhyanga) ====
Seven Factors of Enlightenment

===== Neutral =====
- Mindfulness (sati • smṛti)

===== Arousing =====
- Investigation of doctrine (dhamma vicaya • dharma-vicaya)
- Energy (viriya • vīrya)
- Rapture (pīti • prīti)

===== Calming =====
- Tranquillity (passaddhi)
- Concentration (samādhi)
- Equanimity (upekkhā • upekṣā)

==== Noble Eightfold Path (Ariya aṭṭhaṅgika magga • Ārya 'ṣṭāṅga mārgaḥ) ====
Noble Eightfold Path

===== Wisdom (Paññākkhandha) =====
Dharmachakra, symbol of the Noble Eightfold Path, the Buddha's teaching of the path to enlightenment

- Right view (sammā-diṭṭhi • samyag-dṛṣṭi)
  - Mundane right view
    - Karma
  - Supramundane right view
    - Right view that accords with the Four Noble Truths (saccanulomika sammā-diṭṭhi)
      - Study
      - Contemplation
      - Meditation
    - Right view that penetrates the Four Noble Truths (saccapativedha sammā-diṭṭhi)
- Right intention (sammā-saṅkappa • samyak-saṃkalpa)
  - The intention of renunciation (nekkhamma-sankappa)
  - The intention of non-ill will (abyapada-sankappa)
  - The intention of harmlessness (avihimsa-sankappa)

===== Moral discipline (Sīlakkhandha) =====
- Right speech (sammā-vācā • samyag-vāc)
  - Abstaining from false speech (musāvāda veramaṇī)
  - Abstaining from slanderous speech (pisunaya vacaya veramaṇī)
  - Abstaining from harsh speech (pharusaya vacaya veramaṇī)
    - Abstaining from verbal abuse
    - Abstaining from insults
    - Abstaining from sarcasm
  - Abstaining from idle chatter (samphappalāpa veramaṇī)
- Right action (sammā-kammanta • samyak-karmānta)
  - Abstaining from the taking of life (pāṇātipātā veramaṇī)
    - Abstaining from homicide
    - Abstaining from animal slaughter
      - Abstaining from hunting
      - Abstaining from fishing
      - Abstaining from killing insects
    - Abstaining from deliberately harming or torturing another being
  - Abstaining from taking what is not given (adinnādānā veramaṇī)
    - Abstaining from stealing
    - Abstaining from robbery
    - Abstaining from snatching
    - Abstaining from fraudulence
    - Abstaining from deceitfulness
  - Abstaining from sexual misconduct (kāmesu micchācāra veramaṇī)
    - Abstaining from adultery
    - Abstaining from sexual harassment
    - Abstaining from rape
- Right livelihood (sammā-ājīva • samyag-ājīva)
  - Abstaining from dealing in weapons
  - Abstaining from dealing in living beings (including raising animals for slaughter as well as slave trade and prostitution)
  - Abstaining from dealing in meat production and butchery
  - Abstaining from dealing in poisons
  - Abstaining from dealing in intoxicants
  - Abstaining from deceit
  - Abstaining from treachery
  - Abstaining from soothsaying
  - Abstaining from trickery
  - Abstaining from usury

===== Concentration (Samādhikkhandha) =====
- Right effort (sammā-vāyāma • samyag-vyāyāma)
  - The effort to prevent the arising of unarisen unwholesome states of mind (samvarappadhana)
    - Wise attention (yoniso manasikara)
    - Restraint of the sense faculties (indriya-samvara)
  - The effort to abandon unwholesome states of mind that have already arisen (pahanappadhana)
    - Overcoming the Five hindrances
  - The effort to generate wholesome states of mind that have not yet arisen (bhavanappadhana)
    - Seven Factors of Enlightenment (satta sambojjhaṅgā • sapta bodhyanga)
      - Mindfulness (sati)
      - Investigation of doctrine (dhamma vicaya)
      - Energy (viriya • vīrya)
      - Rapture (pīti)
      - Tranquillity (passaddhi)
      - Concentration (samādhi)
      - Equanimity (upekkha)
  - The effort to maintain and perfect wholesome states of mind already arisen (anurakkhanappadhana)
- Right mindfulness (sammā-sati • samyak-smṛti)
  - Contemplation of the body (kāyanupassana)
  - Contemplation of feeling (vedanānupassana)
  - Contemplation of states of mind (cittanupassana)
  - Contemplation of phenomena (dhammānupassana)
- Right concentration (sammā-samādhi • samyak-samādhi)
  - Four jhānas
    - First jhāna (pathamajjhana)
    - Second jhāna (dutiyajjhana)
    - Third jhāna (tatiyajjhana)
    - Fourth jhāna (catutthajjhana)

===== Acquired factors =====
- Right knowledge (sammā-ñāṇa)
- Right liberation (sammā-vimutti)

=== Buddhist meditation ===
==== Theravada meditation practices ====
===== Tranquillity/Serenity/Calm (Samatha • Śamatha) =====
Samatha

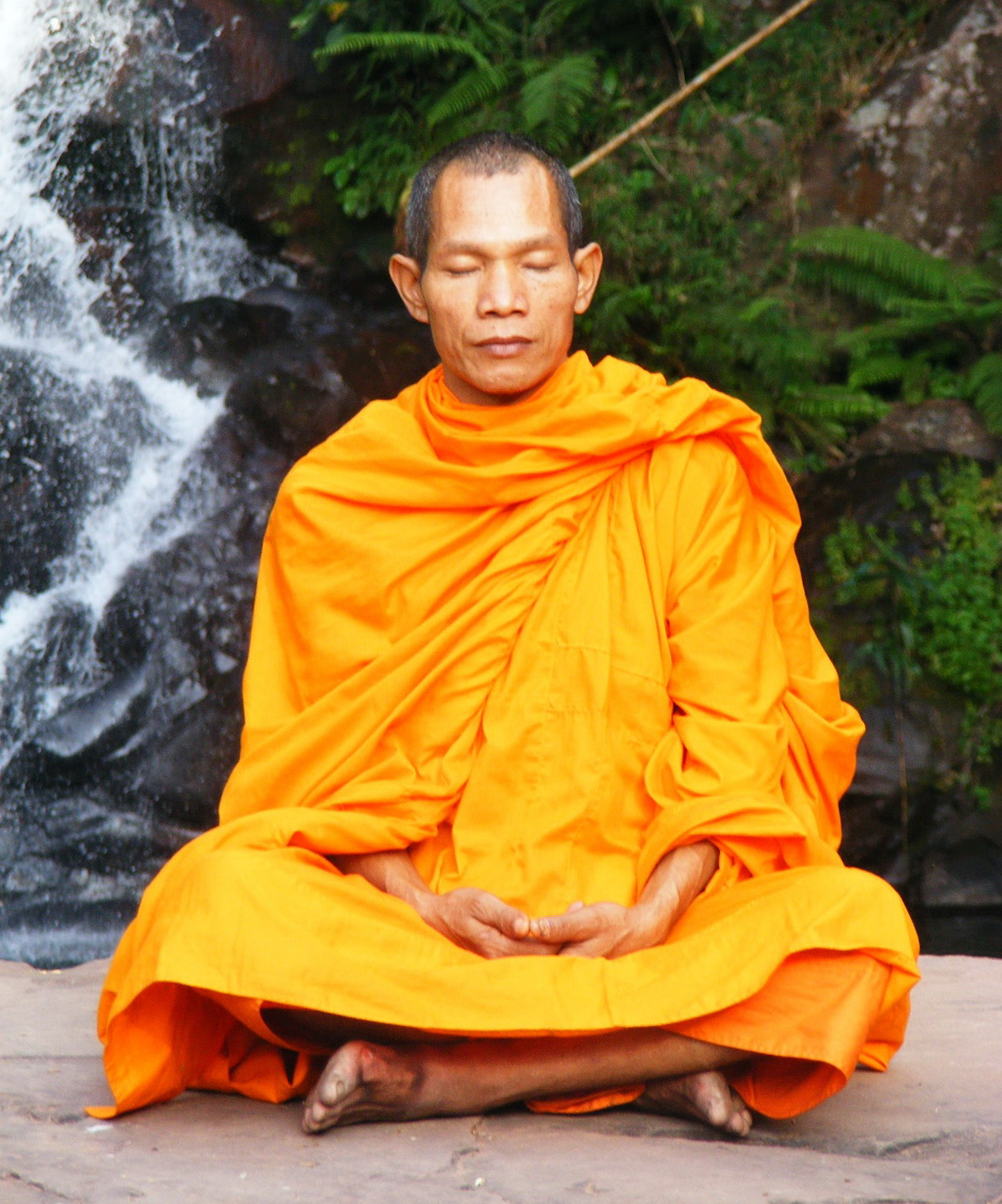
A Buddhist monk meditating

- Place of work (kammaṭṭhāna)
  - Ten Kasinas
    - Earth kasina (pathavikasinam)
    - Water kasina (apokasinam)
    - Fire kasina (tejokasinam)
    - Wind kasina (vayokasinam)
    - Brownish or deep purplish blue kasina (nilakasinam)
    - Yellow kasina (pitakasinam)
    - Red kasina (lohitakasinam)
    - White kasina (odatakasinam)
    - Light kasina (alokakasinam)
    - Open air-space, sky kasina (akasakasinam)
  - Ten reflections on repulsiveness (asubas)
    - A swollen or bloated corpse (uddhumatakam)
    - A corpse brownish black or purplish blue with decay (vinilakam)
    - A festering or suppurated corpse (vipubbakam)
    - A corpse splattered half or fissured from decay (vicchiddakam)
    - A corpse gnawed by animals such as wild dogs and foxes (vikkhayittakam)
    - A corpse scattered in parts, hands, legs, head and body being dispersed (vikkhitakam)
    - A corpse cut and thrown away in parts after killing (hatavikkhittakam)
    - A bleeding corpse, i.e. with red blood oozing out (lohitakam)
    - A corpse infested with and eaten by worms (puluvakam)
    - Remains of a corpse in a heap of bones, i.e. skeleton (atthikam)
  - Ten Recollections (anussati • anusmriti)
    - Buddhānussati (Buddhanusmrti) — Recollection of the Buddha — fixing the mind with attentiveness and reflecting repeatedly on the glorious virtues and attributes of Buddha
    - Dhammānussati (Dharmanusmrti) — Recollection of the Dhamma — reflecting with serious attentiveness repeatedly on the virtues and qualities of Buddha's teachings and his doctrine
    - Saṅghānussati (Sanghanusmrti) — Recollection of the Saṅgha — fixing the mind strongly and repeatedly upon the rare attributes and sanctity of the Sangha
    - Sīlānussati — Recollection of virtue — reflecting seriously and repeatedly on the purification of one's own morality or sīla
    - Cāgānussati — Recollection of generosity — reflecting repeatedly on the mind's purity in the noble act of one's own dāna, charitableness and liberality
    - Devatānussati — Recollection of deities — reflecting with serious and repeated attention on one's own complete possession of the qualities of absolute faith (saddhā), morality (sīla), learning (suta), liberality (cāga) and wisdom (paññā) just as the devas have, to enable one to be reborn in the world of devas
    - Maraṇānussati — Mindfulness of death — reflecting repeatedly on the inevitability of death
    - Kāyagatāsati — Mindfulness of the body — reflecting earnestly and repeatedly on the impurity of the body which is composed of the detestable 32 constituents such as hair, body hair, nails, teeth, skin, etc.
    - Ānāpānasati — Mindfulness of breathing — repeated reflection on the inhaled and exhaled breath
    - Upasamānussati — Recollection of peace — reflecting repeatedly with serious attentiveness on the supreme spiritual blissful state of Nirvana
  - Four Divine Abidings (brahmavihāra)
    - Loving-kindness (mettā • maitrī)
    - Compassion (karuṇā)
    - Sympathetic joy (muditā)
    - Equanimity (upekkhā • upekṣā)
  - Four formless jhānas (arūpajhāna)
    - Base of the infinity of space (ākāsānañcāyatana)
    - Base of the infinity of consciousness (viññāṇañcāyatana)
    - Base of nothingness (ākiñcaññāyatana)
    - Base of neither-perception-nor-nonperception (nevasaññānāsaññāyatana)
  - Perception of disgust of food (aharepatikulasanna)
  - Four Great Elements (mahābhūta)
    - Earth element (paṭhavī-dhātu)
    - Water (or liquid) element (āpo-dhātu)
    - Fire element (tejo-dhātu)
    - Air (or wind) element (vāyo-dhātu)

===== Concentration (Samādhi) =====
- Sign (nimitta)
  - Learning sign (uggahanimitta)
  - Counterpart sign (paṭibhāganimitta)
- Momentary concentration (khaṇikasamādhi)
- Preliminary concentration (parikammasamādhi)
- Neighbourhood concentration (upacārasamādhi)
- Nine attainments (samāpatti)
  - Attainment concentration (appanāsamādhi)
    - Jhāna (Dhyāna) — states of deep meditative concentration marked by the one-pointed fixation of the mind upon its object
      - Four form jhānas (rūpajhāna)
        - First jhāna (pathamajjhana)
          - initial application (vittaka)
          - sustained application (vicāra)
          - rapture (pīti)
          - bliss (sukha)
          - one-pointedness (ekaggata)
        - Second jhāna (dutiyajjhana)
          - rapture (pīti)
          - bliss (sukha)
          - one-pointedness (ekaggata)
        - Third jhāna (tatiyajjhana)
          - bliss (sukha)
          - one-pointedness (ekaggata)
        - Fourth jhāna (catutthajjhana)
          - one-pointedness (ekaggata)
          - equanimity (upekkhā • upekṣā)
      - Four formless jhānas (arūpajhāna)
        - Base of the infinity of space (ākāsānañcāyatana)
        - Base of the infinity of consciousness (viññāṇañcāyatana)
        - Base of nothingness (ākiñcaññāyatana)
        - Base of neither-perception-nor-nonperception (nevasaññānāsaññāyatana)
  - Cessation of perception and feeling (nirodha-samāpatti)

===== Insight meditation (Vipassanā • Vipaśyanā) =====
- Insight knowledge (vipassanā-ñāṇa)
  - Vipassana jhanas
  - Eighteen kinds of insight
    - Contemplation on impermanence (aniccanupassana) overcomes the wrong idea of permanence
    - Contemplation on unsatisfactoriness (dukkhanupassana) overcomes the wrong idea of real happiness
    - Contemplation on non-self (anattanupassana) overcomes the wrong idea of self
    - Contemplation on disenchantment (revulsion) (nibbidanupassana) overcomes affection
    - Contemplation on dispassion (fading away) (viraganupassana) overcomes greed
    - Contemplation on cessation (nirodhanupassana) overcomes the arising
    - Contemplation on giving up (patinissagganupassana) overcomes attachment
    - Contemplation on dissolution (khayanupassana) overcomes the wrong idea of something compact
    - Contemplation on disappearance (vayanupassana) overcomes kamma-accumulation
    - Contemplation on changeableness (viparinamanupassana) overcomes the wrong idea of something immutable
    - Contemplation on the signless (animittanupassana) overcomes the conditions of rebirth
    - Contemplation on the desireless (appanihitanupassana) overcomes longing
    - Contemplation on emptiness (suññatanupassana) overcomes clinging
    - Higher wisdom and insight (adhipaññadhamma vipassana) overcomes the wrong idea of something substantial
    - True eye of knowledge (yathabhuta ñanadassana) overcomes clinging to delusion
    - Contemplation on misery (adinavanupassana) overcomes clinging to desire
    - Reflecting contemplation (patisankhanupassana) overcomes thoughtlessness
    - Contemplation on the standstill of existence (vivattanupassana) overcomes being entangled in fetters
  - Sixteen Stages of Vipassanā Knowledge
    - Knowledge to distinguish mental and physical states (namarupa pariccheda ñāṇa)
    - Knowledge of the cause-and-effect relationship between mental and physical states (paccaya pariggaha ñāṇa)
    - Knowledge of mental and physical processes as impermanent, unsatisfactory and nonself (sammasana ñāṇa)
    - Knowledge of arising and passing away (udayabbaya ñāṇa)
    - Knowledge of the dissolution of formations (bhanga ñāṇa)
    - Knowledge of the fearful nature of mental and physical states (bhaya ñāṇa)
    - Knowledge of mental and physical states as unsatisfactory (adinava ñāṇa)
    - Knowledge of disenchantment (nibbida ñāṇa)
    - Knowledge of the desire to abandon the worldly state (muncitukamayata ñāṇa)
    - Knowledge which investigates the path to deliverance and instills a decision to practice further (patisankha ñāṇa)
    - Knowledge which regards mental and physical states with equanimity (sankharupekha ñāṇa)
    - Knowledge which conforms to the Four Noble Truths (anuloma ñāṇa)
    - Knowledge of deliverance from the worldly condition (gotrabhu ñāṇa)
    - Knowledge by which defilements are abandoned and are overcome by destruction (magga ñāṇa)
    - Knowledge which realizes the fruit of the path and has nibbana as object (phala ñāṇa)
    - Knowledge which reviews the defilements still remaining (paccavekkhana ñāṇa)

==== Zen meditation practices ====
- Zazen
  - Concentration
  - Kōan — a story, dialogue, question, or statement in Zen, containing aspects that are inaccessible to rational understanding, yet may be accessible to intuition
  - Shikantaza — just sitting

==== Vajrayana meditation practices ====
- Tonglen
- Tantra
  - Anuttarayoga Tantra
    - Generation stage
    - Completion stage
- Margaphala
- Ngöndro — Four thoughts which turn the mind towards Dharma
  - The freedoms and advantages of precious human rebirth
  - The truth of impermanence and change
  - The workings of karma
  - The suffering of living beings within Samsara

=== Other practices ===
- Ahimsa — Non-violence
- Appamada — Heedfulness
- Chöd — advanced spiritual practice and discipline arising from confluences of Bonpo, Mahasidda, Nyingmapa traditions and now practiced throughout the schools of Tibetan Buddhism
- Merit
- Paritta — Protection
- Samvega and pasada
- Simran

== Attainment of Enlightenment ==
Enlightenment in Buddhism

=== General ===
- Nirvana (Nibbāna • Nirvāṇa) — the final goal of the Buddha's teaching; the unconditioned state beyond the round of rebirths, to be attained by the destruction of the defilements; Full Enlightenment or Awakening, the cessation of suffering; saupādisesa-nibbāna-dhātu – Nibbāna with residue remaining
  - Parinirvana (Parinibbāna • Parinirvāṇa) — final passing away of an enlightened person, final Nibbāna, Nibbāna at death; anupādisesa-nibbāna-dhātu – Nibbāna without residue remaining
- Bodhi — the awakening attained by the Buddha and his accomplished disciples, referring to insight into the Four Noble Truths and the Noble Eightfold Path
- Types of Buddha
  - Sammāsambuddha (Samyak-saṃbuddha) — one who, by his own efforts, attains Nirvana, having rediscovered the Noble Eightfold Path after it has been lost to humanity, and makes this Path known to others
  - Paccekabuddha (Pratyekabuddha) — "a lone Buddha", a self-awakened Buddha, but one who lacks the ability to spread the Dhamma to others
  - Sāvakabuddha (Śrāvakabuddha) — enlightened 'disciple of a Buddha'. Usual being named Arhat

=== Theravada ===
- Four stages of enlightenment (see also: Ariya-puggala – Noble Ones)
  - Sotāpanna — Stream-enterer (first stage of enlightenment) — one who has "opened the eye of the Dhamma", and is guaranteed enlightenment after no more than seven successive rebirths, having eradicated the first three fetters
    - The four factors leading to stream-entry
      - Association with superior persons
      - Hearing the true Dhamma
      - Careful attention
      - Practice in accordance with the Dhamma
    - The four factors of a stream-enterer
      - Possessing confirmed confidence in the Buddha
      - Possessing confirmed confidence in the Dhamma
      - Possessing confirmed confidence in the Sangha
      - Possessing moral virtues dear to the noble ones
  - Sakadagami — Once-returner (second stage of enlightenment) — will be reborn into the human world once more, before attaining enlightenment, having eradicated the first three fetters and attenuated greed, hatred, and delusion
  - Anāgāmi — Non-returner (third stage of enlightenment) — does not come back into human existence, or any lower world, after death, but is reborn in the "Pure Abodes", where he will attain Nirvāṇa, having eradicated the first five fetters
  - Arahant — "Worthy One", (see also: Arhat), a fully enlightened human being who has abandoned all ten fetters, and who upon decease (Parinibbāna) will not be reborn in any world, having wholly abandoned saṃsāra

=== Mahayana ===
- Bodhisattva — one who has generated bodhicitta, the spontaneous wish to attain Buddhahood
  - Bodhisattva Bhumis — stages of enlightenment through which a bodhisattva passes

=== Zen ===
- Satori — a Japanese Buddhist term for "enlightenment", which translates as a flash of sudden awareness, or individual enlightenment
- Kensho — "Seeing one's nature"

== Buddhist monasticism and laity ==
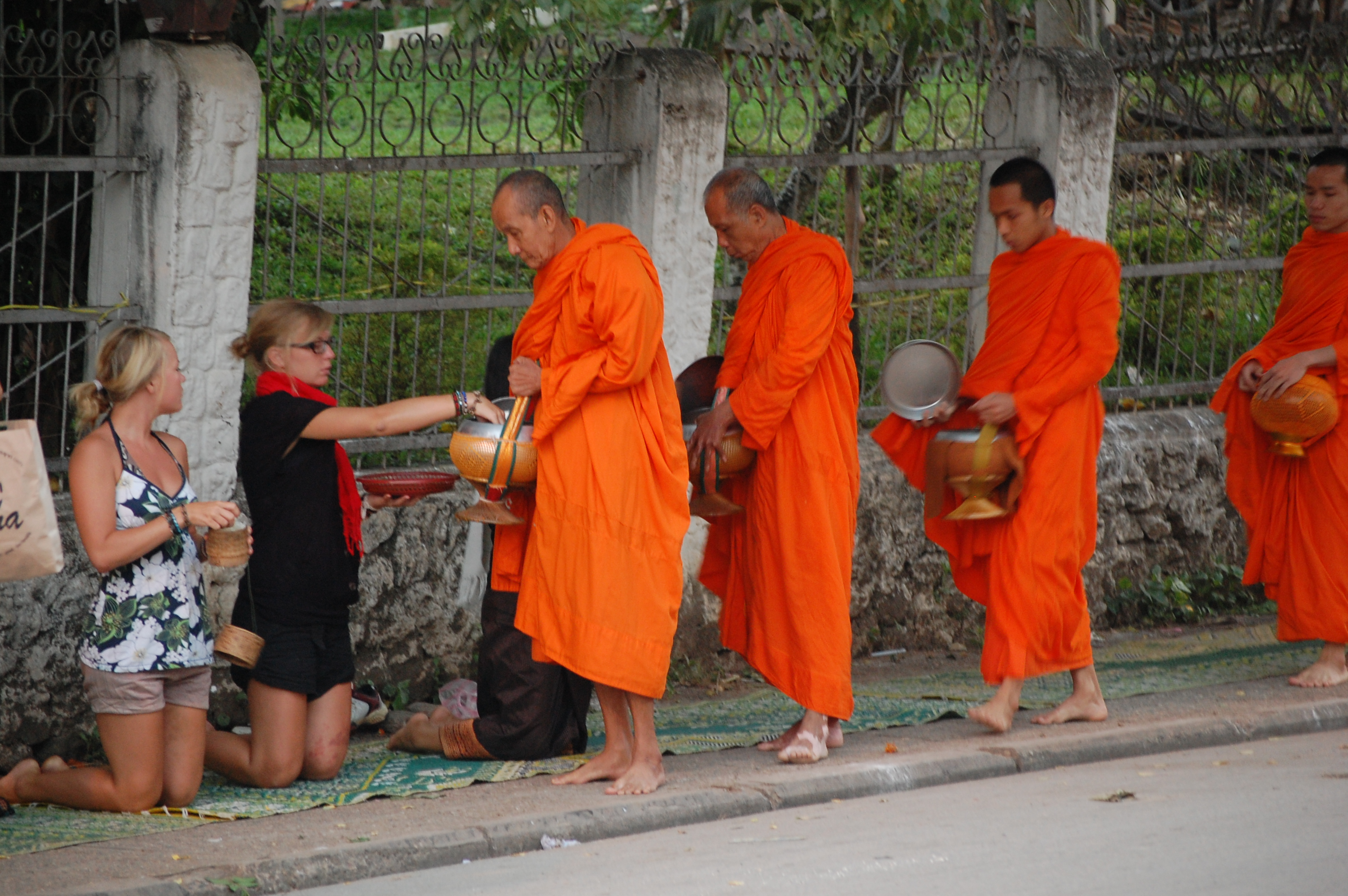
Buddhist monks on daily alms round.

Buddhist monasticism

- Disciple 声闻弟子ShengWenDiZi (sāvaka • śrāvaka)
- Male lay follower (忧婆塞 YouPoSai) (upāsaka) and Female lay follower (忧婆夷 YouPoYi) (upāsikā)
  - Householder 在家弟子ZaiJiaDiZi
  - Dhammacārī — lay devotees who have seriously committed themselves to Buddhist practice for several years
  - Anāgārika — lay attendant of a monk
  - 近侍Jisha (Japan), JinShi (chinese) — personal attendant of a monastery's abbot or teacher in Chan/Zen Buddhism
  - Ngagpa — non-monastic male practitioners of such disciplines as Vajrayana, shamanism, Tibetan medicine, Tantra and Dzogchen
  - Thilashin — Burmese Buddhist female lay renunciant
  - Mae ji — Buddhist laywomen in Thailand occupying a position somewhere between that of an ordinary lay follower and an ordained monk
- Lower ordination (pabbajja • pravrajya)
  - Novice monk (sāmaṇera • śrāmaṇera)
  - Novice nun (samaṇerī • śrāmaṇerī)
- Higher ordination (upasampadā)
  - Monk (bhikkhu • bhikṣu)
  - Nun (bhikkhunī • bhikṣuṇī)
- Titles for Buddhist teachers
  - General
    - Acariya (Ācārya) — teacher
    - Upajjhaya (Upādhyāya) — preceptor
    - Pandita — a learned master, scholar or professor in Buddhist philosophy
    - Bhante — Venerable Sir
  - in Theravada
    - in Southeast Asia
      - Ayya — commonly used as a veneration in addressing or referring to an ordained Buddhist nun
    - in Thailand
      - Ajahn — Thai term which translates as teacher
      - Luang Por — means "venerable father" and is used as a title for respected senior Buddhist monastics
    - in Burma
      - Sayādaw — a Burmese senior monk of a monastery
    - in China
      - 和尚，Heshang — high-ranking or highly virtuous Buddhist monk; respectful designation for Buddhist monks in general
      - 僧侣，SengLv — Monk
      - 住持，ZhuChi — Abbot
      - 禅师，ChanShi — Chan/Zen Master
      - 法师，FaShi — Dharma Master
      - 律师，LvShi — Vinaya Master, teacher who focuses on the discipline and precepts
      - 开山祖师，KaiShanZuShi — founder of a school of Buddhism or the founding abbot of a Zen monastery
      - 比丘，BiQiu — transliteration of Bhikkhu
      - 比丘尼，BiQiuNi — transliteration of Bhikkhuni
      - 沙弥，ShaMi — transliteration of Samanera
      - 沙弥尼，ShaMiNi — transliteration of Samaneri
      - 尼姑，NiGu — Nun
      - 论师，LunShi — Abhidharma Master, one who is well versed in the psychology, thesis and higher teachings of Buddhism
      - 师兄，ShiXiong — dharma brothers, used by laity to address each other, note that all male or female lay disciples are called 'Dharma Brothers'
  - in Japan
    - Ajari — a Japanese term that is used in various schools of Buddhism in Japan, specifically Tendai and Shingon, in reference to a "senior monk who teaches students
    - 和尚 Oshō — high-ranking or highly virtuous Buddhist monk; respectful designation for Buddhist monks in general
  - in Zen
    - in Japan
      - 开山 Kaisan — founder of a school of Buddhism or the founding abbot of a Zen monastery
      - 老师 Roshi — a Japanese honorific title used in Zen Buddhism that literally means "old teacher" or "elder master" and usually denotes the person who gives spiritual guidance to a Zen sangha
      - 先生 Sensei — ordained teacher below the rank of roshi
      - Zen master — individual who teaches Zen Buddhism to others
    - in Korea
      - Sunim — Korean title for a Buddhist monk or Buddhist nun
  - in Tibetan Buddhism
    - Geshe — Tibetan Buddhist academic degree for monks
    - Guru
    - Khenpo — academic degree similar to that of a doctorate or Geshe. Khenpos often are made abbots of centers and monasteries
    - Khenchen — academic degree similar in depth to post doctorate work. Senior most scholars often manage many Khenpos
    - Lama — Tibetan teacher of the Dharma
    - Rinpoche — an honorific which literally means "precious one"
    - Tulku — an enlightened Tibetan Buddhist lama who has, through phowa and siddhi, consciously determined to take birth, often many times, to continue his or her Bodhisattva vow

== Major figures of Buddhism ==
List of Buddhists

=== Founder ===
- Gautama Buddha — The Buddha, Siddhattha Gotama (Pali), Siddhārtha Gautama (Sanskrit), Śākyamuni (Sage of the Sakya clan), The Awakened One, The Enlightened One, The Blessed One, Tathāgata (Thus Come One, Thus Gone One)

=== Buddha's disciples and early Buddhists ===
==== Chief Disciples ====
- Sāriputta — Chief disciple, "General of the Dhamma", foremost in wisdom
- Mahamoggallāna — Second chief disciple, foremost in psychic powers

==== Great Disciples ====
===== Monks =====
- Ānanda — Buddha's cousin and personal attendant
- Maha Kassapa — Convener of First Buddhist Council
- Anuruddha — Half-cousin of the Buddha
- Mahakaccana — Foremost in teaching
- Nanda — Half-brother of the Buddha
- Subhuti
- Punna
- Upali — Master of the Vinaya

===== Nuns =====
- Mahapajapati Gotami — Eldest nun, half-mother of Buddha
- Khema — First great female disciple in power
- Uppalavanna — Second great female disciple
- Patacara — Foremost exponent of the Vinaya, the rules of monastic discipline

==== Laymen ====
- Anathapindika — Chief lay disciple, foremost disciple in generosity
- Hatthaka of Alavi
- Jivaka
- Citta — the foremost householder for explaining the Teaching
- Cunda

==== Laywomen ====
- Khujjuttara
- Velukandakiya
- Visakha
- Rohini
- Sujata

==== First five disciples of the Buddha ====
- Kondañña — the first Arahant
- Assaji — converted Sāriputta and Mahamoggallāna
- Bhaddiya
- Vappa
- Mahanama

==== Two seven-year-old Arahants ====
- Samanera Sumana
- Samanera Pandita

==== Other disciples ====
- Channa — royal servant and head charioteer of Prince Siddhartha
- Angulimala — mass murderer turned saint
- Kisa Gotami

=== Later Indian Buddhists (after Gotama Buddha) ===
- Ashoka – emperor of the Indian subcontinent emperor from 268 to 232 BCE and a convert who facilitated the spread of Buddhism across Asia
- Sanghamitta — daughter of Emperor Ashoka
- Mahinda — son of Emperor Ashoka
- Nagarjuna — founder of the Madhyamaka school
- Aryadeva — disciple of Nagarjuna
- Asanga — exponent of the yogācāra school
- Vasubandhu
- Buddhaghosa — 5th-century Indian Theravadin Buddhist commentator and scholar, author of the Visuddhimagga
- Buddhapālita — commentator on the works of Nagarjuna and Aryadeva
- Candrakīrti
- Dharmakirti
- Atisha
- B. R. Ambedkar – a Father of modern India, Polymath, Revivalist of Buddhism

=== Indo-Greek Buddhists ===
- Dharmaraksita
- Nagasena

=== Chinese Buddhists ===
- Bodhidharma
- Dajian Huineng
- Ingen

=== Tibetan Buddhists ===
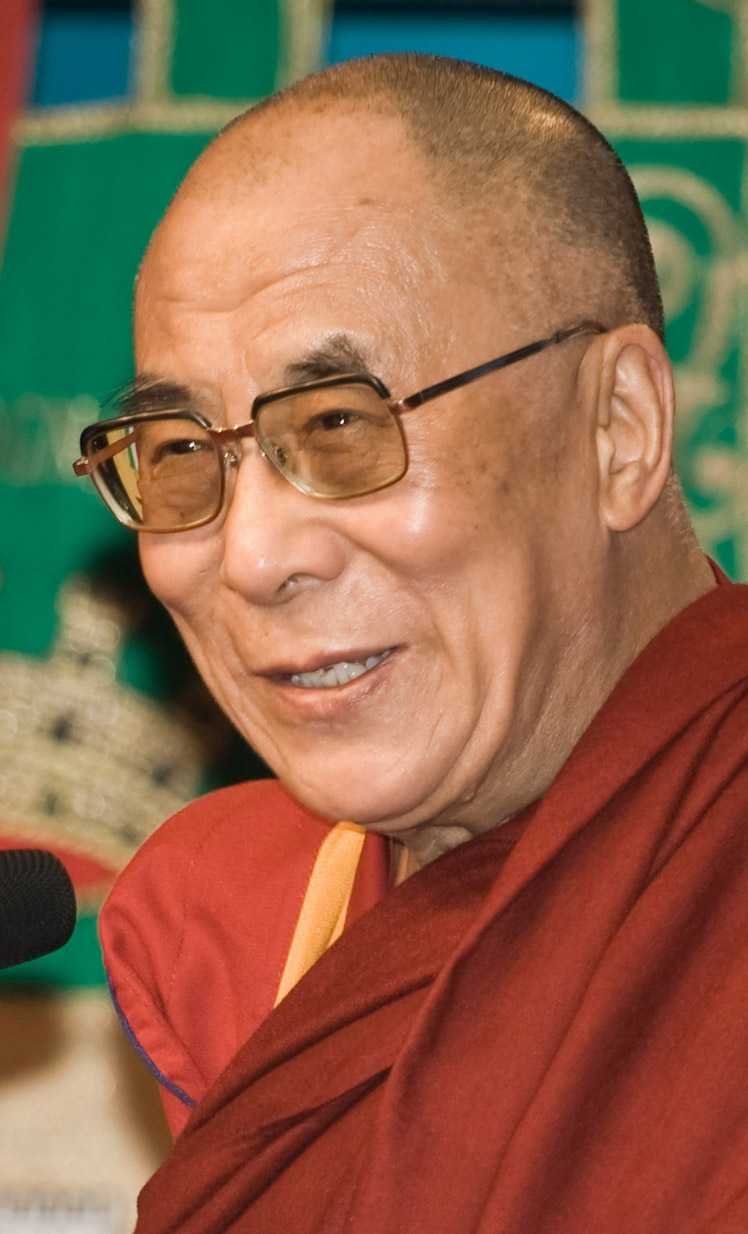
The 14th Dalai Lama, Tenzin Gyatso, a renowned Tibetan lama.

- Je Tsongkhapa
- Milarepa
- Longchenpa
- Marpa Lotsawa
- Padmasambhava
- Drogmi — founder of the Sakya school of Tibetan Buddhism
- Sakya Pandita
- Panchen Lama
- Karmapa
- Dalai Lama
  - 1st Dalai Lama
  - 2nd Dalai Lama
  - 3rd Dalai Lama
  - 4th Dalai Lama
  - 5th Dalai Lama
  - 6th Dalai Lama
  - 7th Dalai Lama
  - 8th Dalai Lama
  - 9th Dalai Lama
  - 10th Dalai Lama
  - 11th Dalai Lama
  - 12th Dalai Lama
  - 13th Dalai Lama
  - 14th Dalai Lama

=== Japanese Buddhists ===
- Saichō
- Kūkai
- Hōnen
- Shinran
- Dōgen
- Eisai
- Nichiren

=== Vietnamese Buddhists ===
- Trần Thái Tông
- Trần Thánh Tông
- Trần Nhân Tông
- Trần Anh Tông
- Trần Minh Tông
- Trần Hiến Tông
- Trần Dụ Tông
- Trần Nghệ Tông
- Trần Duệ Tông
- Trần Hưng Đạo
- Trần Thuận Tông
- Trần Thiếu Đế
- Lý Thái Tổ
- Lý Thái Tông
- Lý Thường Kiệt
- Lý Long Tường
- Thich Quang Duc
- Thích Trí Quang
- Thích Nhất Hạnh
- Thich Thiên Ân
- Thích Quảng Độ
- Thích Thanh Từ
- Thích Nhật Từ
- Thich Chan Khong

=== Burmese Buddhists ===
- Ledi Sayadaw
- Mahāsī Sayādaw
- Mother Sayamagyi
- S. N. Goenka
- U Ba Khin
- U Nārada
- U Pandita
- Webu Sayadaw

=== Thai Buddhists ===
- Ajahn Buddhadasa
- Ajahn Chah
- Ajahn Lee
- Ajahn Maha Bua
- Ajahn Mun Bhuridatta
- Ajahn Thate

=== Sri Lankan Buddhists ===
- Balangoda Ananda Maitreya
- Henepola Gunaratana
- K. Sri Dhammananda
- Piyadassi Maha Thera
- Walpola Rahula

=== American Buddhists ===
- Ajahn Sumedho
- Bhikkhu Bodhi
- Thanissaro Bhikkhu

=== Brazilian Buddhists ===
- Ajahn Mudito
- Monja Coen
- Lama Michel Rinpoche

=== British Buddhists ===
- Ajahn Amaro
- Ajahn Brahm
- Ajahn Khemadhammo
- Houn Jiyu-Kennett
- Ñāṇamoli Bhikkhu
- Ñāṇavīra Thera
- Arthur Lillie

=== German Buddhists ===
- Ayya Khema
- Bhikkhu Analayo
- Muho Noelke
- Nyanatiloka
- Nyanaponika Thera

=== Irish Buddhists ===
- U Dhammaloka

== Buddhist philosophy ==
Buddhist philosophy

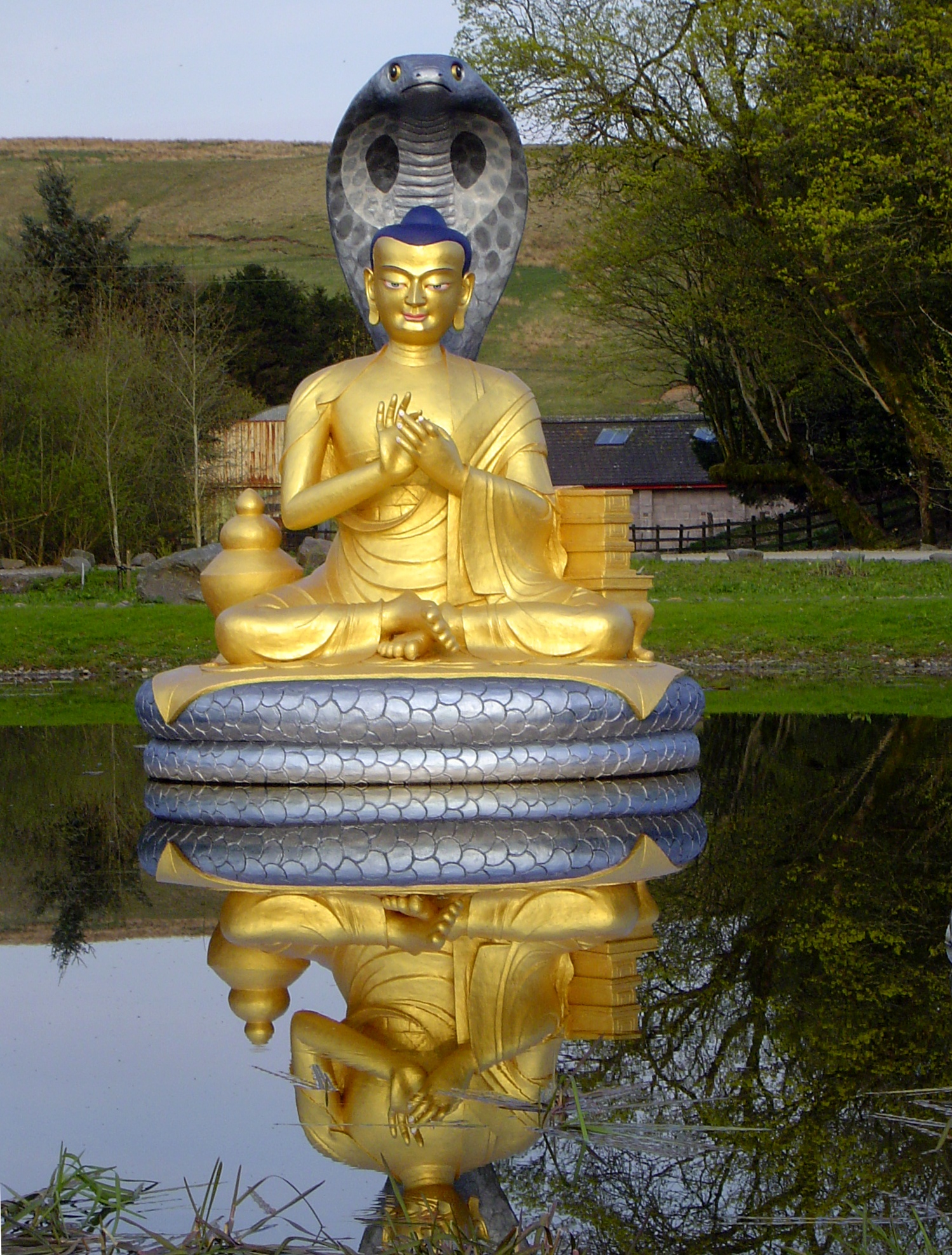
Golden statue of Nagarjuna at Samye Ling Monastery.

- Abhidharma (Abhidhamma)
- Buddhist anarchism
- Buddhist atomism
- Buddhism and the body
- Buddhology
- Engaged Buddhism
- Buddhist economics
- Buddhist eschatology
- Buddhist ethics
  - Buddhism and abortion
  - Buddhism and euthanasia
  - Buddhism and sexuality
    - Buddhist views on masturbation
    - LGBT topics and Buddhism
- Buddhism and evolution
- Four imponderables
- Fourteen unanswerable questions
  - Questions referring to the world: concerning the existence of the world in time
    - Is the world eternal?
    - or not?
    - or both?
    - or neither?
  - Questions referring to the world: concerning the existence of the world in space
    - Is the world finite?
    - or not?
    - or both?
    - or neither?
  - Questions referring to personal experience
    - Is the self identical with the body?
    - or is it different from the body?
  - Questions referring to life after death
    - Does the Tathagata exist after death?
    - or not?
    - or both?
    - or neither?
- God in Buddhism
- Humanistic Buddhism
- Buddhist logic
- Buddhist mythology
- Reality in Buddhism
- Buddhist socialism

== Buddhist culture ==
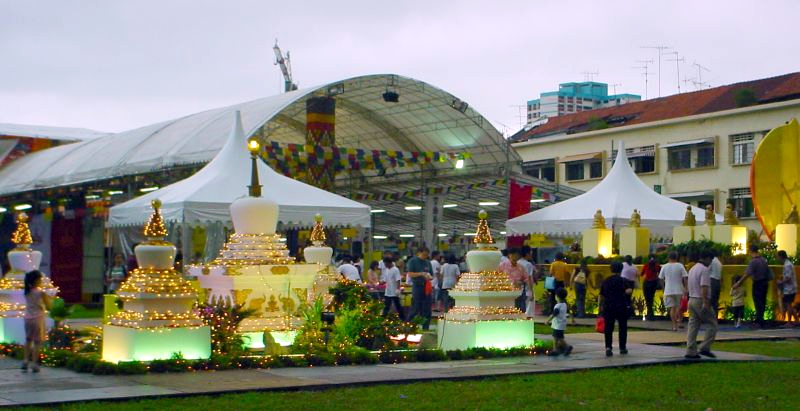
Vesak celebration in Singapore.

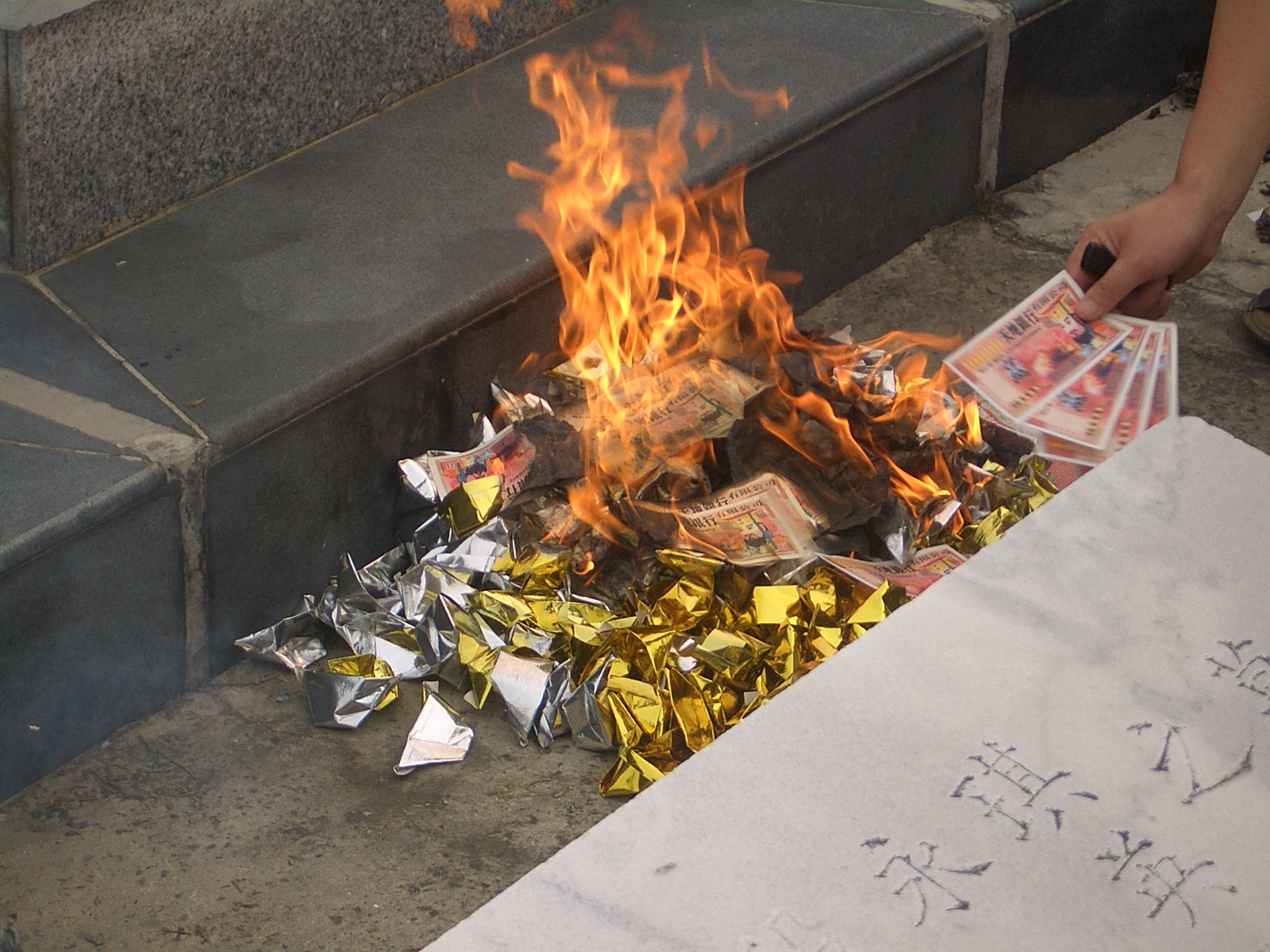
Imitation currency burned for ancestors, during the Ghost Festival

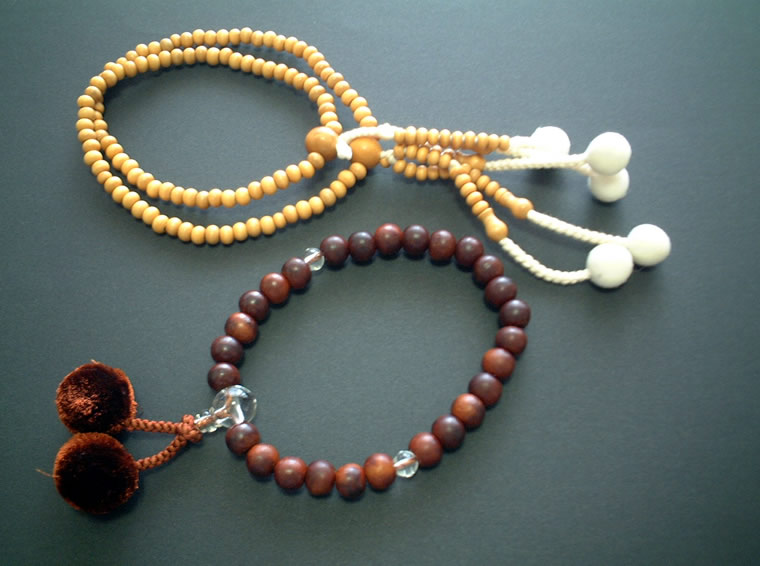
Mala, Buddhist prayer beads.

- Alms
- Ango — three-month-long period of intense training for students of Zen Buddhism
- Buddhist architecture
  - Vihara — Buddhist monastery
  - Wat — monastery temple in Cambodia, Thailand, Lanna or Laos
  - Thai temple art and architecture
  - Stupa — mound-like structure containing Buddhist relics
  - Pagoda — tiered tower with multiple eaves common in China, Japan, Korea, Vietnam, and other parts of Asia
  - Zendo — meditation hall in Zen Buddhism
  - Butsudan — shrine
- Buddhist art
  - Greco-Buddhist art
    - Standing Buddha
  - Buddhist poetry
  - Buddhist music
  - Buddha statue
    - Colossal Buddha statues
      - Tian Tan Buddha
      - Kamakura Great Buddha
      - Grand Buddha at Ling Shan
      - Leshan Giant Buddha
      - Gifu Great Buddha
      - Great Buddha
- Buddhist calendar
- Buddhist clothes
  - Tricivara — Monastic robe
    - Antaravasaka — Lower robe
    - Uttarasanga — Upper robe
    - Sangati — Outer robe
- Buddhist cuisine
  - Buddhist vegetarianism
- Dharani
- Drubchen — traditional form of meditation retreat in Tibetan Buddhism
- Funeral (Buddhism)
- Buddhist holidays
  - Vesak — birth, enlightenment (Nirvana), and passing away (Parinirvana) of Gautama Buddha
  - Asalha Puja
  - Magha Puja
  - Uposatha — the Buddhist observance days, falling on the days of the full moon and new moon, when the monks gather to recite the Pātimokkha and lay people often visit monasteries and temples to undertake the eight precepts
  - Kathina — festival which comes at the end of Vassa
- Kaicho
- Kīla — three-sided peg, stake, knife, or nail like ritual implement traditionally associated with Indo-Tibetan Buddhism
- Mandala — concentric diagram having spiritual and ritual significance
  - Sand mandala
- Buddhist prayer beads — Mala
- Mantra
  - Om mani padme hum
  - Namo Amituofo
  - Nam Myōhō Renge Kyō
  - Om tare tuttare ture svaha
  - Buddho
  - Namo Tassa Bhagavato Arahato Sammāsambuddhassa
- Buddhist view of marriage
- Mudra — Symbolic or ritual gesture
  - Añjali Mudrā — greeting gesture which consists of putting the palms together in front of the chest
- Buddhist music
- Prayer wheel
- Sarira — Buddhist relics
- Sesshin — period of intensive meditation (zazen) in a Zen monastery
- Buddhist symbolism
  - Dharmacakra — Wheel of Dhamma
  - Bhavacakra — Wheel of Becoming
  - Buddhist flag
  - Ensō — Symbol in Zen symbolizing enlightenment, strength, elegance, the Universe, and the void
  - Thangka
    - Tree of physiology
  - Ashtamangala
- Vajra — short metal weapon that has the symbolic nature of a diamond
- Vassa — Rains retreat

== Buddhist pilgrimage ==
Buddhist pilgrimage

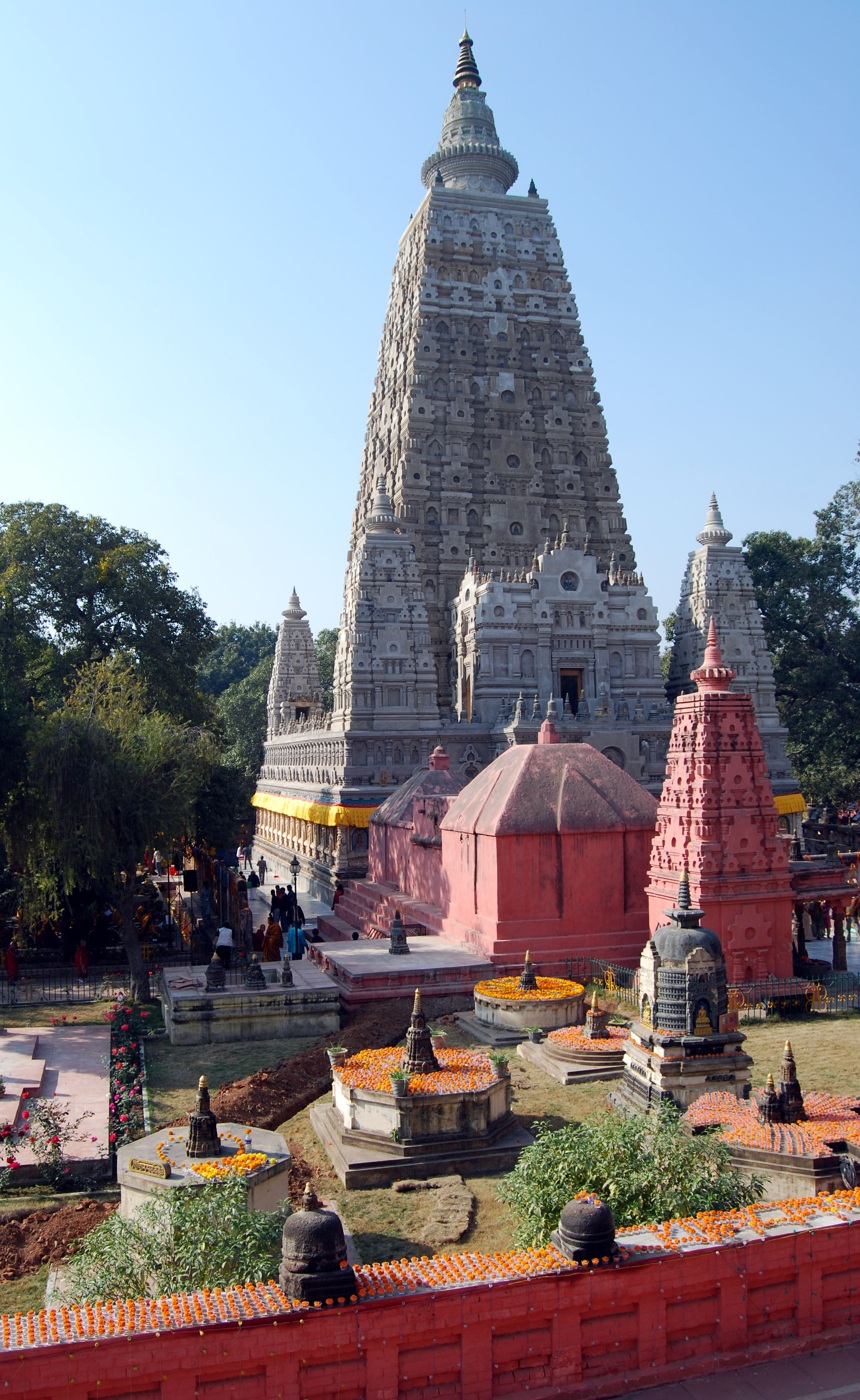
Mahabodhi Temple in India, a common site of pilgrimage.

- The Four Main Sites
  - Lumbini — Buddha's birthplace
    - Maya Devi Temple
  - Bodh Gaya — Buddha's place of Enlightenment
    - Mahabodhi Temple
      - Bodhi Tree
  - Sarnath — Place of Buddha's first discourse
  - Kushinagar — Place of Buddha's final passing away
- Four Additional Sites
  - Sravasti
  - Rajgir
  - Sankassa
  - Vaishali
- Other Sites
  - Patna
  - Gaya
  - Kosambi
  - Mathura
  - Kapilavastu
  - Devadaha
  - Kesariya
  - Pava
  - Nalanda
  - Varanasi
- Later Sites
  - Sanchi
  - Ratnagiri
  - Ellora
  - Ajantha
  - Bharhut

== Comparative Buddhism ==
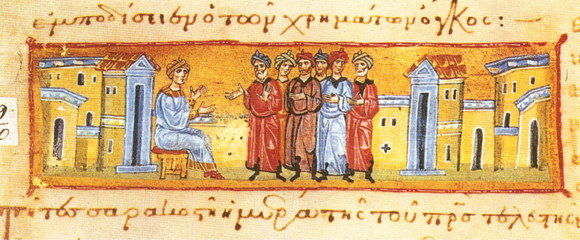
From a 12th-century Greek manuscript: Saint Josaphat preaches the Gospel.

- Buddhism and science
  - Buddhism and psychology
- Buddhism and Theosophy
- Buddhism and other religions
  - Buddhism and Eastern religions
    - Buddhism and Hinduism
    - Buddhism and Jainism
  - Buddhism and Christianity
    - Buddhist-Christian Studies
    - Parallels between Buddha and Jesus
  - Buddhism and Gnosticism
  - Gautama Buddha in world religions

== Other topics related to Buddhism ==
- Access to Insight — Readings in Theravada Buddhism website
- Anuradhapura
  - Mahavihara
  - Abhayagiri Vihara
- Asceticism
- Ashoka the Great
- Basic points unifying Theravāda and Mahāyāna
- Bodhimanda (Bodhimandala)
- Bodhisatta — a future Buddha, one destined to attain unsurpassed perfect enlightenment; specifically, it is the term the Buddha uses to refer to himself in the period prior to his enlightenment, both in past lives and in his last life before he attained enlightenment
- Bodhisattva
  - Akasagarbha
  - Avalokiteśvara (Guan Yin)
  - Guan Yu
  - Ksitigarbha
  - Mahasthamaprapta
  - Metteyya/Maitreya — Future Buddha, successor of Gautama Buddha
  - Manjusri — the bodhisattva associated with wisdom, doctrine and awareness
  - Nio
  - Samantabhadra
  - Shantideva
  - Sitatapatra
  - Skanda
  - Supushpachandra
  - Suryaprabha
  - Tara
  - Vajrapani
  - Vasudhara
- Borobudur — ninth-century Mahayana Buddhist Monument in Magelang, Indonesia
- Brahmā — according to the brahmins, the supreme personal deity, but in the Buddha's teaching, a powerful deity who rules over a high divine state of existence called the brahma world; more generally, the word denotes the class of superior devas inhabiting the form realm
- Brahmacharya — the Holy Life
- Budai or Hotei — the obese Laughing Buddha, usually seen in China
- Buddhas
  - Gautama Buddha
  - Dipankara Buddha
  - Kakusandha Buddha
  - Kassapa Buddha
  - Koṇāgamana Buddha
  - Padumuttara Buddha
  - Adi-Buddha
  - Amitābha — the principal Buddha in the Pure Land sect
  - Medicine Buddha
- Buddhas of Bamyan
- Buddhavacana — the Word of the Buddha
- Buddhist calendar
- Buddhist Initiation Ritual — a public ordination ceremony wherein a lay student of Zen Buddhism receives certain Buddhist precepts, "a rite in which they publicly avow allegiance to 'The Three Refuges' of Buddhist practice: The Buddha, the Dharma and the Sangha
- Buddhist Publication Society — a charity whose goal is to explain and spread the doctrine of the Buddha
- Buddhist studies
- Cambridge Buddhist Association
- Chakravartin — Wheel-turning Monarch
- Critical Buddhism
- Dalit Buddhist movement
- Deva — a deity or god; the beings inhabiting the heavenly worlds, usually in the sense-sphere realm but more broadly in all three realms
- Dhammakaya
  - Wat Phra Dhammakaya
  - Dhammakaya Movement
  - Dhammakaya meditation
- Dharma name
- Dharma talk
- Dharma transmission
- Diamond Way Buddhism
- Dipavamsa
- Eight Thoughts of a Great Man
  - This Dhamma is for one who wants little, not for one who wants much.
  - This Dhamma is for the contented, not for the discontented.
  - This Dhamma is for the secluded, not for one fond of society.
  - This Dhamma is for the energetic, not for the lazy.
  - This Dhamma is for the mindful, not for the unmindful.
  - This Dhamma is for the composed, not for the uncomposed.
  - This Dhamma is for the wise, not for the unwise.
  - This Dhamma is for one who is free from impediments, not for one who delights in impediments
- Empowerment
- European Buddhist Union
- Five Dhyani Buddhas
  - Vairocana
  - Akshobhya
  - Amitābha
  - Ratnasambhava
  - Amoghasiddhi
- Five Pure Lights
- Foundation for the Preservation of the Mahayana Tradition
- Friends of the Western Buddhist Order
- Gandhabba
- Gandhāran Buddhist Texts
- Glossary of Japanese Buddhism
- Hinayana — "Inferior vehicle", often interpreted as a pejorative term used in Mahayana doctrine to refer to the early Buddhist schools
- Icchantika
- Inka
- International Buddhist College
- Jambudvipa — lit., "rose-apple island," the Indian subcontinent
- Jetavana
- Kalachakra
- Kalpa (aeon) — an aeon or cosmic cycle, the period of time it takes for a world system to arise, evolve, dissolve, and persist in a state of disintegration before a new cycle begins
- Kanthaka — Prince Siddhartha's favourite white horse
- Kegon
- King Ajātasattu
- King Bimbisāra
- King Menander I (King Milinda)
- King Pasenādi
- Kosala
- Kwan Um School of Zen
- Laughing Buddha
- Life release – Practice of saving the lives of beings destined for slaughter
- Lineage
- Liturgical languages
  - in Theravada
    - Pāḷi
  - in Mahayana
    - Sanskrit
      - Buddhist Hybrid Sanskrit
- Luang Prabang
- Mahasati meditation
- Mahavamsa
- Māra — "The Evil One" or "Tempter"; a malevolent deity who tries to prevent people from practicing the Dhamma and thereby escaping the round of rebirths
  - Klesa-māra, or Māra as the embodiment of all unskillful emotions
  - Mrtyu-māra, or Māra as death, in the sense of the ceaseless round of birth and death
  - Skandha-māra, or Māra as metaphor for the entirety of conditioned existence
  - Devaputra-māra, or Māra the son of a deva (god), that is, Māra as an objectively existent being rather than as a metaphor
- Medicine Buddha
- Monasteries
  - Angkor Wat
  - Phra Pathom Chedi
  - Shaolin Monastery
  - Shwedagon Pagoda
  - Wat Phra Dhammakaya
  - Wat Phra Kaew
  - Wat Phrathat Doi Suthep
- Nāga — the Serpent King
- Nikāya
- Nikaya Buddhism
- Noble Silence
- Pali Text Society
- Perfection of Wisdom School
- Persecution of Buddhists
- Phra Pathom Chedi
- Preaching
- Purity in Buddhism
- Pyrrhonism
- Ramifications of the Buddha concept
- Reincarnation
- Saddhamma — True Dhamma
- Sakka — the King of gods
- Samaṇa
  - Six samana
    - Purana Kassapa
    - Makkhali Gosala
    - Ajita Kesakambali
    - Pakudha Kaccayana
    - Nigaṇṭha Nātaputta (Mahavira)
    - Sanjaya Belatthaputta
- Samāpatti — correct acquisition of Truth
- Sāsana — Dispensation
- Shakya — ancient kingdom of Iron Age India, Siddhartha Gautama's clan
- Shambhala Buddhism
- Southern, Eastern and Northern Buddhism
- Sumeru — central world-mountain in Buddhist cosmology
- Sutra
- The birth of Buddha (Lalitavistara)
- The Path to Nirvana
- Three Ages of Buddhism
- Three Turnings of the Wheel of Dharma
- Triratna Buddhist Community
- True Buddha School
- Two foremost teachers (two persons which one can never pay back gratitude-debts in full)
  - One's mother
  - One's father
- Vipassana movement
- Women in Buddhism
- World Buddhist Sangha Council
- World Fellowship of Buddhists
- Yakkha — a broad class of nature-spirits, usually benevolent, who are caretakers of the natural treasures hidden in the earth and tree roots
- Yama — King of Death
- Yana — Vehicle
  - Śrāvakayāna — the hearer vehicle
  - Pratyekayana — the individual vehicle
  - Bodhisattvayāna
- Young Buddhist Association
- Young Men's Buddhist Association
- Zabuton — rectangular meditation cushion
- Zafu — round meditation cushion

== Lists ==
- Glossary of Buddhism
- Index of Buddhism-related articles
- List of Buddhas
  - List of the twenty-eight Buddhas
- List of Buddha claimants
- List of bodhisattvas
- List of Buddhists
- List of modern scholars in Buddhist studies
- List of suttas
  - in Theravada
    - List of Digha Nikaya suttas
    - List of Majjhima Nikaya suttas
    - List of Samyutta Nikaya suttas
    - List of Anguttara Nikaya suttas
    - List of Khuddaka Nikaya suttas
  - in Mahayana
    - Mahayana sutras
- List of Buddhist temples
  - Buddhist temples in Japan
    - List of Buddhist temples in Kyoto
  - Korean Buddhist temples
  - List of Buddhist Architecture in China
  - List of Buddhist temples in Thailand
- List of writers on Buddhism
- Buddha games list

== See also ==
- Outline of religion

== Charts ==
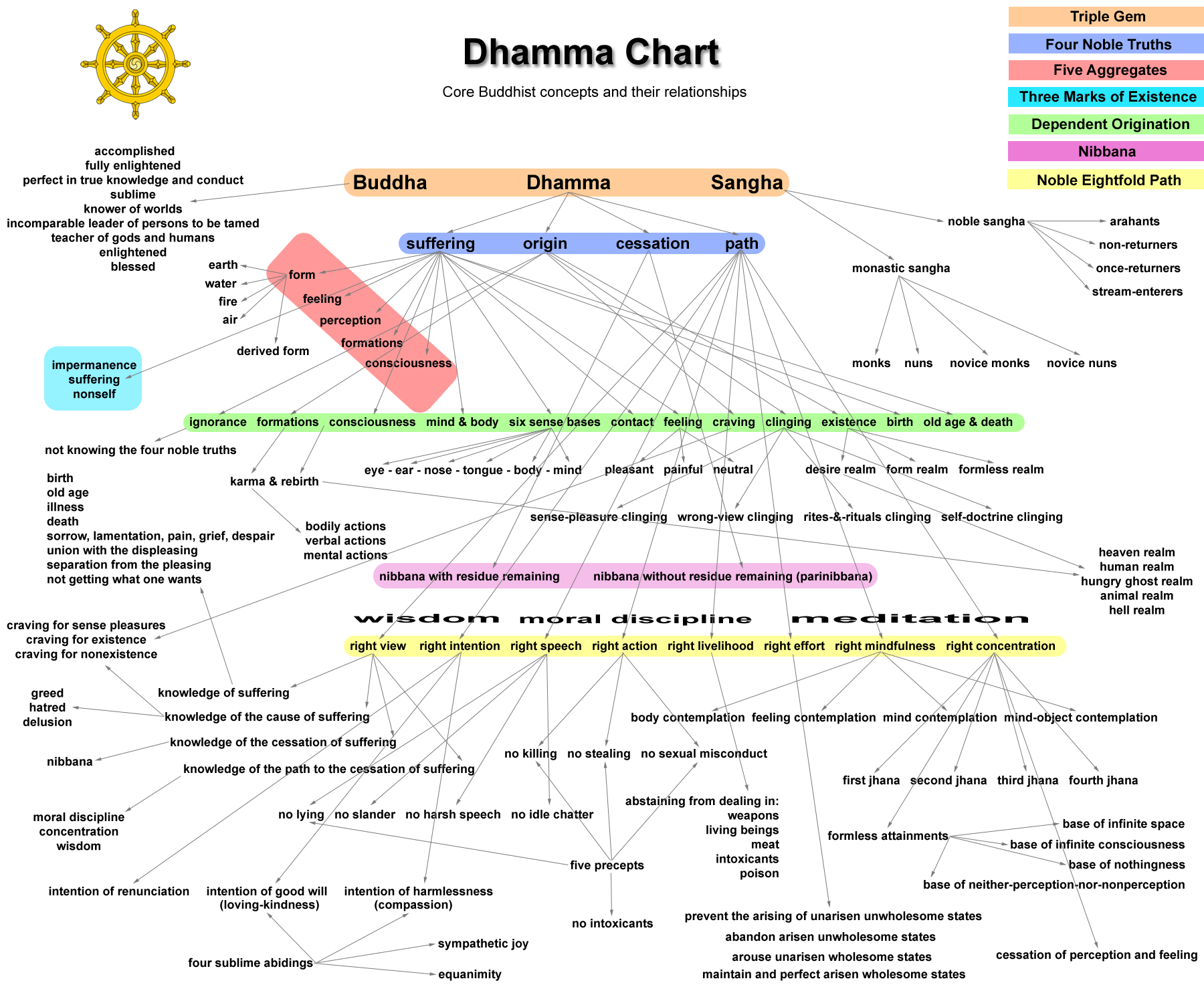
Dhamma chart in English

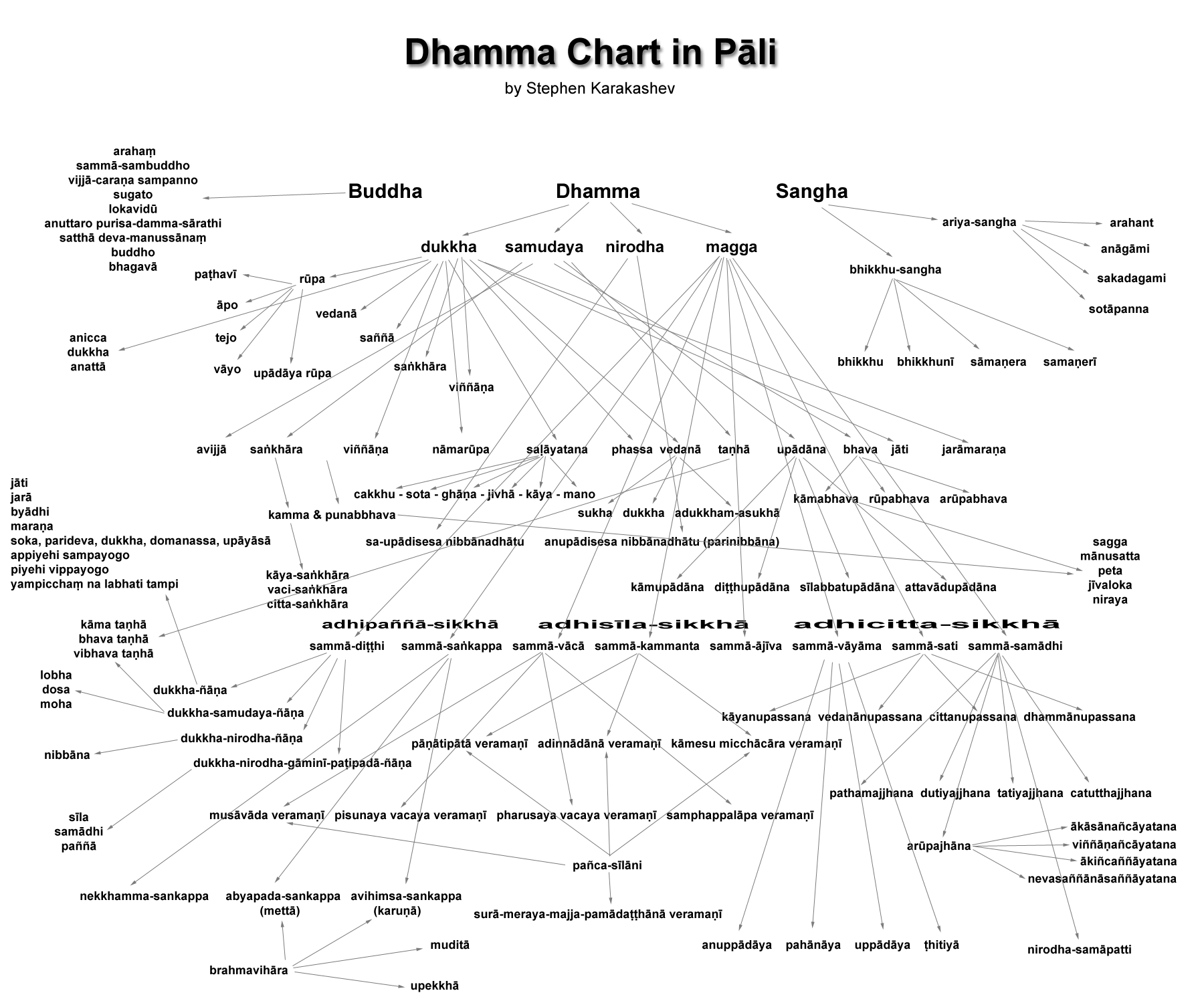
Dhamma chart in the Pali language

== Sources ==
- Embree, Ainslie T.; Hay, Stephen N.; de Bary, Wm. Theodore, eds. (1988) [1958], Sources of Indian Tradition: From the Beginning to 1800, vol. 1, A.L. Bashram, R.N. Dandekar, Peter Hardy, J.B. Harrison, V. Raghavan, Royal Weiler, and Andrew Yarrow (2nd ed.), New York: Columbia University Press, ISBN 0-231-06651-1
