= Sacredness =

Dedicated or set apart for the service or worship of a deity

Sacred describes something that is dedicated or set apart for the service or worship of a deity; is considered worthy of spiritual respect or devotion; or inspires awe or reverence among believers. The property is often ascribed to objects (a "sacred artifact" that is venerated and blessed), or places ("sacred ground").

== Etymology ==
The word sacred descends from the Latin sacer, referring to that which is 'consecrated, dedicated' or 'purified' to the gods or anything in their power, as well as to sacerdotes. Latin sacer is itself from Proto-Indo-European *seh₂k- "sacred, ceremony, ritual".

== Holy ==
Although the English language terms sacred and holy are similar in meaning, and they are sometimes used interchangeably, they carry subtle differences. In the Christian tradition, holiness is generally used in relation to people and relationships, whereas sacredness is used in relation to objects, places, or happenings. For example, a saint may be considered holy but not necessarily sacred. Nonetheless, some things can be both holy and sacred, such as the Holy Bible.

Although sacred and holy denote something or someone set apart to the worship of God and therefore, worthy of respect and sometimes veneration, holy (the stronger word) implies an inherent or essential character. Holiness originates in God and is communicated to things, places, times, and persons engaged in His Service. Thus, Thomas Aquinas defines holiness as that virtue by which a man's mind applies itself and all its acts to God; he ranks it among the infused moral virtues, and identifies it with the virtue of religion. However, whereas religion is the virtue whereby one offers God due service in the things which pertain to the Divine service, holiness is the virtue by which one makes all one's acts subservient to God. Thus, holiness or sanctity is the outcome of sanctification, that Divine act by which God freely justifies a person and by which He has claimed them for His own.

=== Etymology of 'holy' ===
The English word holy dates back to the Proto-Germanic word hailagaz from around 500 BC, an adjective derived from hailaz ('whole'), which was used to mean 'uninjured, sound, healthy, entire, complete'. In non-specialist contexts, the term holy refers to someone or something that is associated with a divine power, such as water used for baptism.

== Transitions ==
The concept of things being made or associated with the sacred is widespread among religions, making people, places, and objects revered, set apart for special use or purpose, or transferred to the sacred sphere. Words for this include hallow, sanctify, and consecrate, which can be contrasted with desecration and deconsecration. These terms are used in various ways by different groups.

Sanctification and consecration come from the Latin sanctificare (to set apart for special use or purpose, make holy or sacred) and consecratus (dedicated, devoted, and sacred).

=== Christianity ===
The verb form 'to hallow' is archaic in English, and no longer appears other than in the quoted text in the Lord's Prayer in the New Testament. The noun form hallow is a synonym of the word saint.

In the various branches of Christianity the details differ. Sanctification in Christianity usually refers to a person becoming holy, while consecration in Christianity may include setting apart a person, building, or object, for God. Among some Christian denominations there is a complementary service of "deconsecration", to remove something consecrated of its sacred character in preparation for either demolition or sale for secular use.

=== Judaism ===
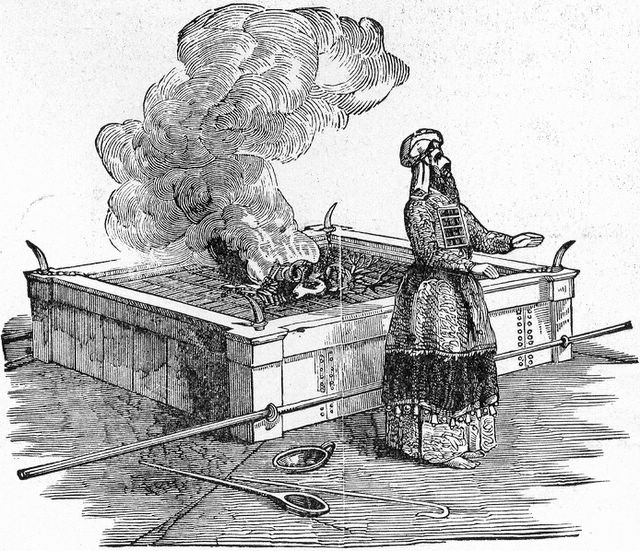
The High Priest offers the sacrifice of a goat performing korban

The Book of Exodus describes in detail the consecration of Aaronite priests and cultic objects through washing, vesting, anointing, and sacrifice, concluding that both the priests and their garments become holy. Similarly, the altar is sanctified in such a way that anything that comes into contact with it also becomes consecrated, rendering it unsuitable for ordinary use. A commentary on the Book of Leviticus reads, "Throughout Priestly thought, holiness is conceived of as an effervescence of the Presence of the Lord. It infuses everything with which it comes into contact ... transforming it into the designated 'personal' property of the deity."

In rabbinic Judaism sanctification means sanctifying God's name by works of mercy and martyrdom, while desecration of God's name means committing sin. This is based on the Jewish concept of God, whose holiness is pure goodness and is transmissible by sanctifying people and things.

=== Islam ===
In Islam, sanctification is termed as tazkiah, other similarly used words to the term are Islah-i qalb (reform of the heart), Ihsan (beautification), taharat (purification), Ikhlas (purity), qalb-is-salim (pure/safe/undamaged heart). Tasawuf (Sufism), basically an ideology rather than a term, is mostly misinterpreted as the idea of sanctification in Islam and it is used to pray about saints, especially among Sufis, in whom it is common to say "that God sanctifies his secret" ("qaddasa Llahou Sirruhu"), and that the Saint is alive or dead.

=== Buddhism ===
Images of the Buddha and bodhisattvas are ceremonially consecrated in a broad range of Buddhist rituals that vary depending on the Buddhist traditions. Buddhābhiseka is a Pali and Sanskrit term referring to these consecration rituals.

=== Mormonism ===
Mormonism is replete with consecration doctrine, primarily Christ's title of "The Anointed One" signifying his official, authorized and unique role as the savior of mankind from sin and death, and secondarily each individual's opportunity and ultimate responsibility to accept Jesus' will for their life and consecrate themselves to living thereby wholeheartedly. Book of Mormon examples include "sanctification cometh because of their yielding their hearts unto God" (Heleman 3:35) and "come unto Christ, who is the Holy One of Israel, and partake of his salvation, and the power of his redemption, ... and offer your whole souls as an offering unto him, and continue in fasting and praying, and endure to the end; and as the Lord liveth ye will be saved" (Omni 1:26).

=== Hinduism ===
In most South Indian Hindu temples around the world, Kumbhabhishekam, or the temple's consecration ceremony, is done once every 12 years. It is usually done to purify the temple after a renovation or simply done to renew the purity of the temple. Hindus celebrate this event on the consecration date as the witnessing gives a good soul a thousand "punya", or good karma.

=== Jainism ===
Panch Kalyanaka Pratishtha Mahotsava is a traditional Jain ceremony that consecrates one or more Jain Tirthankara icons with celebration of Panch Kalyanaka (five auspicious events). The ceremony is generally held when a new Jain temple is erected or new idols are installed in temples. The consecration must be supervised by a religious authority, an Acharya or a Bhattaraka or a scholar authorized by them.

== In academia ==
=== Hierology ===
Hierology (Greek: ιερος, hieros, 'sacred or 'holy', + -logy) is the study of sacred literature or lore. The concept and the term were developed in 2002 by Russian art-historian and byzantinist Alexei Lidov.

=== History of religions ===
Analysing the dialectic of the sacred, Mircea Eliade outlines that religion should not be interpreted only as "belief in deities", but as "experience of the sacred." The sacred is presented in relation to the profane; the relation between the sacred and the profane is not of opposition, but of complementarity, as the profane is viewed as a hierophany.

=== Sociology ===
French sociologist Émile Durkheim argued that the sacred appears to be connected to a higher realm but is in fact a symbolic encounter with society itself, produced and sustained through collective representations and ritual practices. Later scholars such as Alan Mittleman and Mircea Eliade modified this view by treating sacredness as an emergent phenomenon rather than a mere social illusion. Durkheim also considered the dichotomy between the sacred and the profane to be the central characteristic of religion: "religion is a unified system of beliefs and practices relative to sacred things, that is to say, things set apart and forbidden." In Durkheim's theory, the sacred represented the interests of the group, especially unity, which were embodied in sacred group symbols, or totems. The profane, on the other hand, involved mundane individual concerns. Durkheim explicitly stated that the dichotomy sacred/profane was not equivalent to good/evil. The sacred could be good or evil, and the profane could be either as well.

== In religion ==
=== Ancient religions ===
In ancient Roman religion, the concept of sacrosanctity (Latin: sacrosanctitas) was extremely important in attempting to protect the tribunes of the plebs from personal harm. The tribunician power was later arrogated to the emperors in large part to provide them with the role's sacred protections. In addition to sanctifying temples and similar sanctuaries, the Romans also undertook the ritual of the sulcus primigenius when founding a new city—particularly formal colonies—in order to make the entire circuit of the town's wall ritually sacred as a further means of protection. In order to allow the removal of corpses to graveyards and similarly profane work, the city gates were left exempted from the rite.

=== Indic religions ===
Indian-origin religion, namely Hinduism and its offshoots Buddhism, Jainism and Sikhism, have concept of revering and conserving ecology and environment by treating various objects as sacred, such as rivers, trees, forests or groves, mountains, etc.

==== Hinduism ====
Sacred rivers and their reverence is a phenomenon found in several religions, especially religions which have eco-friendly belief as core of their religion. For example, the Indian-origin religions (Buddhism, Hinduism, Jainism, and Sikism) revere and preserve the groves, trees, mountains and rivers as sacred. Among the most sacred rivers in Hinduism are the Ganges, Yamuna, Sarasvati rivers on which the rigvedic rivers flourished. The vedas and Gita, the most sacred of hindu texts were written on the banks of Sarasvati river which were codified during the Kuru kingdom in present-day Haryana. Among other secondary sacred rivers of Hinduism are Narmada and many more.

Among the sacred mountains, the most sacred among those are Mount Kailash (in Tibet), Nanda Devi, Char Dham mountains and Amarnath mountain, Gangotri mountain. Yamunotri mountain, Sarasvotri mountain (origin of Sarasvati River), Dhosi Hill, etc.

==== Buddhism ====
In Theravada Buddhism one finds the designation of ariya-puggala ('noble person'). Buddha described the Four stages of awakening of a person depending on their level of purity. This purity is measured by which of the ten samyojana ('fetters') and klesha have been purified and integrated from the mindstream. These persons are called (in order of increasing sanctity) Sotāpanna, Sakadagami, Anāgāmi, and Arahant.

=== Abrahamic religions ===
==== Christianity ====
The range of denominations provide a wide variety of interpretations on sacredness. The Anglican, Catholic, Lutheran, and Methodist Churches, believe in Holy Sacraments that the clergy perform, such as Holy Communion and Holy Baptism, as well as strong belief in the Holy Catholic Church, Holy Scripture, Holy Trinity, and the Holy Covenant. They also believe that angels and saints are called to holiness. In Methodist Wesleyan theology holiness has acquired the secondary meaning of the reshaping of a person through entire sanctification. The Holiness movement began within the United States Methodist church among those who thought the church had lost the zeal and emphasis on personal holiness of Wesley's day. Around the middle of the 20th century, the Conservative Holiness Movement, a conservative offshoot of the Holiness movement, was born. The Higher Life movement appeared in the British Isles during the mid-19th century.

Commonly recognized outward expressions or "standards" of holiness among more fundamental adherents frequently include applications relative to dress, hair, and appearance: e.g., short hair on men, uncut hair on women, and prohibitions against shorts, pants on women, make-up and jewelry. Other common injunctions are against places of worldly amusement, mixed swimming, smoking, minced oaths, as well as the eschewing of television and radio.

==== Islam ====
Among the names of God in the Quran is Al-Quddus (القدوس): found in Q59:23 and 62:1, the closest English translation is 'holy' or 'sacred'. (It shares the same triliteral Semitic root, Q-D-Š, as the Hebrew kodesh.) Another use of the same root is found in the Arabic name for Jerusalem: al-Quds, 'the Holy'.

The word ḥarām (حرام), often translated as 'prohibited' or 'forbidden', is better understood as 'sacred' or 'sanctuary' in the context of places considered sacred in Islam. For example:

- the Masjid al-Haram, or the 'Sacred Mosque in Mecca', constituting the immediate precincts of the Kaaba;
- al-Haramain, or 'the (two) Sanctuaries', a reference to the twin holy cities of Mecca and Medina; and
- the Haram ash-Sharif, or 'Noble Sanctuary', the precincts of the Dome of the Rock and al-Aqsa Mosque in Jerusalem.

==== Judaism ====
The Hebrew word kodesh (קֹדֶשׁ) is used in the Torah to mean "set apart" and "distinct." Kodesh is also commonly translated as "holy" and "sacred." Holiness (kedushah) is presented as something that is actively produced through their relationship to God or through designation for sacred purposes. This relational understanding is reflected in both ritual law and everyday practices, such as marriage. Classical and modern thinkers alike emphasize that holiness is not a physical property but a status shaped by divine command, communal recognition, and human intention. More broadly, Jewish thought maintains that holiness is not confined to extraordinary places or moments but can permeate ordinary life through attentiveness, ethical action, and ritual practice. In this view, holiness emerges through cooperation between divine presence and human response, transforming the everyday world rather than rejecting it.

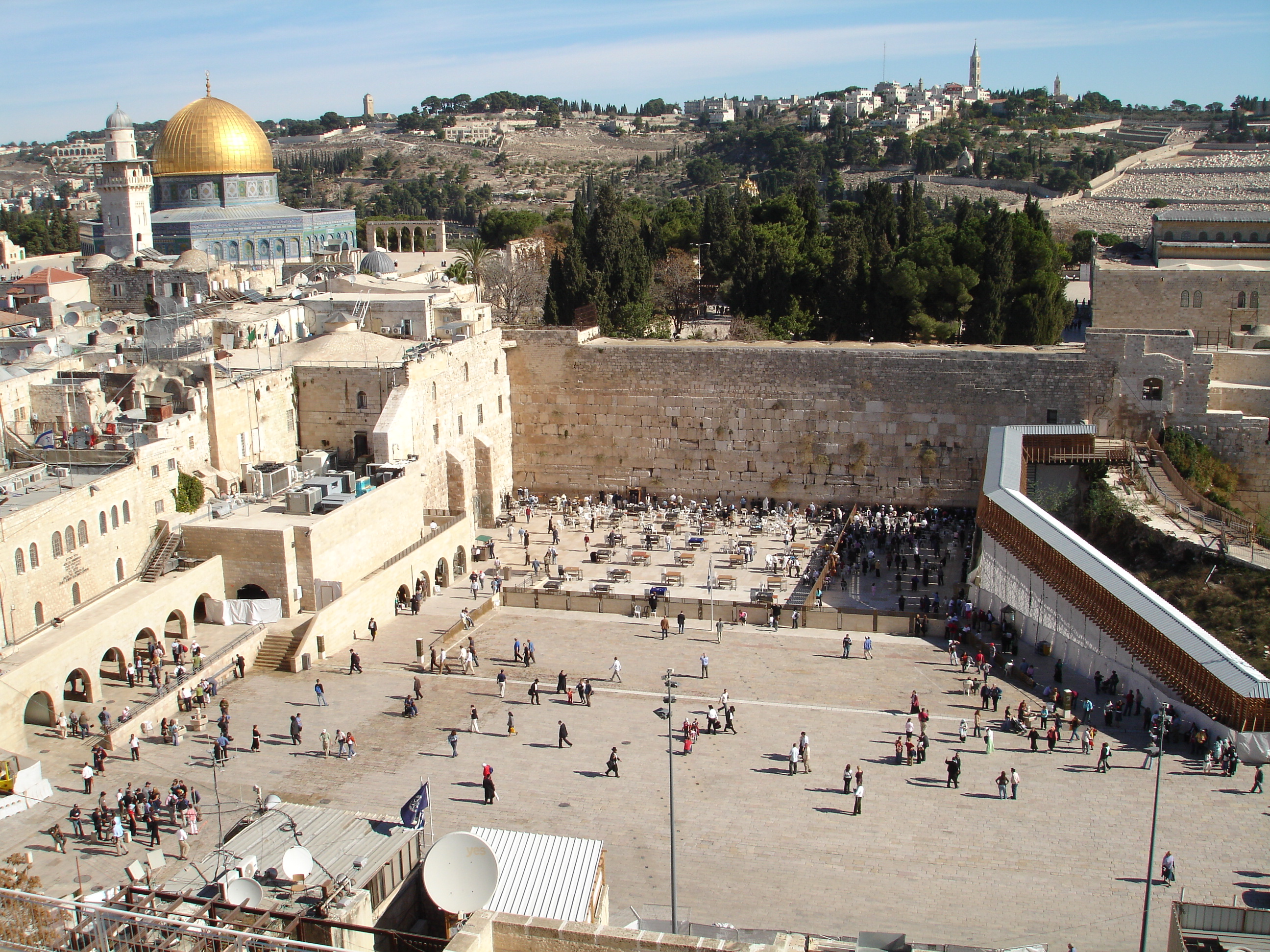
The Western Wall, one of the last relics of the Temple in Jerusalem

Holiness is not a single state, but contains a broad spectrum. The Mishnah lists concentric circles of holiness surrounding the Temple in Jerusalem: Holy of Holies, Temple Sanctuary, Temple Vestibule, Court of Priests, Court of Israelites, Court of Women, Temple Mount, the walled city of Jerusalem, all the walled cities of Israel, and the borders of the Land of Israel. Distinctions are made as to who and what are permitted in each area.

Time plays a particularly central role in Jewish conceptions of holiness, with Shabbat and Jewish holidays regarded as among the most enduring and accessible form of sanctity after the Temple's destruction. Biblical and rabbinic sources describe the Sabbath as holy independent of human observance, yet insist that preparation and behavioral distinctions are necessary to experience its sanctity fully. Work is not allowed on those days, and rabbinic tradition lists 39 categories of activity that are specifically prohibited.

== See also ==
- Numinous

== Sources ==
- Durkheim, Emile (1915) The Elementary Forms of the Religious Life. London: George Allen & Unwin (originally published 1915, English translation 1915).
- Eliade, Mircea (1957) The Sacred and the Profane: The Nature of Religion. Translated by Willard R. Trask. (New York: Harcourt, Brace & World).
- Thomas Jay Oord and Michael Lodahl (2006) Relational Holiness: Responding to the Call of Love. Kansas City, Missouri: Beacon Hill. ISBN 978-0-8341-2182-9
- Pals, Daniel (1996) Seven Theories of Religion. New York: Oxford University Press. US ISBN 0-19-508725-9 (pbk).
- Sharpe, Eric J. (1986) Comparative Religion: A History, 2nd ed., (London: Duckworth, 1986/La Salle: Open Court). US ISBN 0-8126-9041-9.
