= Kleshas (Buddhism) =

In Buddhism, mental states that cloud the mind

Translations of kleshas
- English: afflictions, destructive emotions, disturbing emotions, negative emotions, mind poisons, etc.
- Sanskrit: क्लेश (kleśa)
- Pali: (kilesa)
- Burmese: ကိလေသာ (MLCTS: kḭlèθà)
- Chinese: 煩惱 (Pinyin: fánnǎo)
- Indonesian: pengotor batin, kotoran batin, kekotoran batin
- Japanese: 煩悩 (Rōmaji: bonnō)
- Khmer: កិលេស (UNGEGN: kĕlés)
- Korean: 번뇌 (RR: beonnoe)
- Mongolian: нисванис (nisvanis)
- Tagalog: kilsha
- Tibetan: ཉོན་མོངས། (Wylie: nyon mongs; THL: nyönmong)
- Thai: กิเลส (RTGS: Kilet)
- Vietnamese: phiền não

Kleshas (Sanskrit: क्लेश, romanized: kleśa; Pali: किलेस kilesa; Standard Tibetan: ཉོན་མོངས། nyon mongs, Chinese: 煩惱 fánnǎo, Japanese: 煩悩 bonnō), in Buddhism, are mental states that cloud the mind and manifest in unwholesome actions. Kleshas include states of mind such as anxiety, fear, anger, jealousy, desire, etc. Contemporary translators use a variety of English words to translate the term kleshas, such as: afflictions, defilements, destructive emotions, disturbing emotions, negative emotions, mind poisons, and neuroses.

Currently in the Mahayana and Theravada Buddhist traditions, the three kleshas of ignorance, attachment, and aversion are identified as the root or source of all other kleshas. These are referred to as the three poisons in the Mahayana tradition, or as the three unwholesome roots in the Theravada tradition.

While the early Buddhist texts of the Pali Canon do not specifically enumerate the three root kleshas, the three poisons (and the kleshas generally) came to be seen as the very roots of samsaric existence.

== Pali literature ==
In the Pali Canon's discourses (sutta), kilesa is often associated with the various passions that defile bodily and mental states. In the Pali Canon's Abhidhamma and post-canonical Pali literature, ten defilements are identified, the first three of which — greed, hatred, delusion — are considered to be the "roots" of suffering.

=== Sutta Piṭaka: mental hindrances ===
In the Pali Canon's Sutta Piṭaka, kilesa and its correlate upakkilesa are affective obstacles to the pursuit of direct knowledge (abhijñā) and wisdom (pañña).

For instance, the Samyutta Nikaya includes a collection of ten discourses (SN 27, Kilesa-saṃyutta) that state that any association of "desire-passion" (chanda-rāgo) with the body or mind is a "defilement of mind" (cittasse'so upakkileso):

"Monks, any desire-passion with regard to the eye is a defilement of the mind. Any desire-passion with regard to the ear... the nose... the tongue... the body... the intellect is a defilement of the mind. When, with regard to these six bases, the defilements of awareness are abandoned, then the mind is inclined to renunciation. The mind fostered by renunciation feels malleable for the direct knowing of those qualities worth realizing."

More broadly, the five hindrances – sensual desire (kāmacchanda), anger (byāpāda), sloth-torpor (thīna-middha), restlessness-worry (uddhacca-kukkucca), and doubt (vicikicchā) – are frequently associated with kilesa in the following (or a similar) manner:

[A]ll those Blessed Ones had first abandoned the five hindrances, defilements of the mind that weaken wisdom ...	sabbe te bhagavanto pañcanīvaraṇe pahāya cetaso upakkilese paññāya dubbalīkaraṇe ... .

Additionally, in the Khuddaka Nikaya's Niddesa, kilesa is identified as a component of or synonymous with craving (taṇhā) and lust (rāga).

=== Abhidhamma: ten defilements and unwholesome roots ===
While the Sutta Pitaka does not offer a list of kilesa, the Abhidhamma Pitaka's Dhammasangani (Dhs. 1229ff.) and Vibhanga (Vbh. XII) as well as in the post-canonical Visuddhimagga (Vsm. XXII 49, 65) enumerate ten defilements (dasa kilesa-vatthūni) as follows:

1. greed (lobha)
2. hatred (dosa)
3. delusion (moha)
4. conceit (māna)
5. wrong views (micchāditthi)
6. doubt (vicikicchā)
7. torpor (thīnaṃ)
8. restlessness (uddhaccaṃ)
9. shamelessness (ahirikaṃ)
10. recklessness (anottappaṃ)

The Vibhanga also includes an eightfold list (aṭṭha kilesa-vatthūni) composed of the first eight of the above ten.

Throughout Pali literature, the first three kilesa in the above tenfold Abhidhamma list (lobha dosa moha) are known as the "unwholesome roots" (akusala-mūla or the root of akusala); and, their opposites (alobha adosa amoha) are the three "wholesome roots" (kusala-mūla or the root of kusala). The presence of such a wholesome or unwholesome root during a mental, verbal or bodily action conditions future states of consciousness and associated mental factors (see Karma).

=== Visuddhimagga: round of defilements ===
12 Factors	3 Rounds
aging-death	aspects of vipāka (results)
↑	aspects of vipāka (results)
birth	aspects of vipāka (results)
↑	↑
becoming	karma
↑	↑
clinging	kilesa
↑	kilesa
craving	kilesa
↑	↑
feeling	vipāka (results)
↑	vipāka (results)
contact	vipāka (results)
↑	vipāka (results)
sense bases	vipāka (results)
↑	vipāka (results)
name-form	vipāka (results)
↑	vipāka (results)
consciousness	vipāka (results)
↑	↑
formations	karma
↑	↑
ignorance	kilesa
Figure: The "three rounds" of Dependent Origination (Vsm. XVII, 298).

The 5th-century CE commentarial Visuddhimagga, in its discussion of "Dependent Origination" (Pali: paticca-samuppada) (Vsm. XVII), presents different expository methods for understanding this teaching's twelve factors (nidana). One method (Vsm. XVII, 298) divides the twelve factors into three "rounds" (vaṭṭa):

- the "round of defilements" (kilesa-vaṭṭa)
- the "round of kamma" (kamma-vaṭṭa)
- the "round of results" (vipāka-vaṭṭa).

In this framework (see Figure to the right, starting from the bottom of the Figure), kilesa ("ignorance") conditions kamma ("formations") which conditions results ("consciousness" through "feelings") which in turn condition kilesa ("craving" and "clinging") which condition kamma ("becoming") and so on. Buddhaghosa (Vsm. XVII, 298) concludes:

So this Wheel of Becoming, having a triple round with these three rounds, should be understood to spin, revolving again and again, forever; for the conditions are not cut off as long as the round of defilements is not cut off.

As can be seen, in this framework, the round of defilements consists of:

- ignorance (avijjā)
- craving (taṇhā)
- clinging (upādāna).

Elsewhere in the Visuddhimagga (Vsm. XXII, 88), in the context of the four noble persons (ariya-puggala, see Four stages of enlightenment), the text refers to a precursor to the attainment of nibbana as being the complete eradication of "the defilements that are the root of the round" (vaṭṭa-mūla-kilesā).

== Sanskrit Sravaka and Mahayana literature ==
=== Three poisons ===
The three kleshas of ignorance, attachment and aversion are referred to as the three poisons (Skt. triviṣa) in the Mahayana tradition and as the three unwholesome roots (Pāli, akusala-mūla; Skt. akuśala-mūla ) in the Theravada tradition. These three poisons (or unwholesome roots) are considered to be the root of all the other kleshas.

=== Five poisons ===
In the Mahayana tradition, the five main kleshas are referred to as the five poisons (Sanskrit: pañca kleśaviṣa; Tibetan-Wylie: dug lnga).

The five poisons consist of the three poisons with two additional poisons: pride and jealousy. Altogether, the five poisons are:

Poison/Klesha	Sanskrit	Pali	Tibetan	Chinese	Description	Alternate translations
Ignorance	moha avidya	moha avijja	gti mug ma rig pa	痴 chī	Lack of discernment; not understanding the way of things	Confusion, bewilderment, delusion
Attachment	rāga	lobha	'dod chags	貪 tān	Attachment or desire for what we like	Desire, passion
Aversion	dvesha	dosa	zhe sdang	瞋 chēn	Aversion for what we don't like, or for what prevents us from getting what we like	Anger, hatred
Pride	māna	māna	nga rgyal	慢 màn	Having an inflated opinion of oneself and a disrespectful attitude toward others	Arrogance, Conceit
Envy	irshya	issā	phrag dog	嫉 jí	Being unable to bear the accomplishments or good fortune of others	Jealousy

=== Six root kleshas of the Abhidharma ===
The Abhidharma-kośa identifies six root kleshas (mūlakleśa):

- Attachment (raga)
- Anger (pratigha)
- Ignorance (avidya)
- Pride/Conceit (māna)
- Doubt (vicikitsa)
- Wrong view/False view/Opinionatedness (dṛiṣṭi)

In the context of the Yogācāra school of Buddhism, Muller (2004: p. 207) states that the Six Klesha arise due to the "...reification of an 'imagined self' (Sanskrit: satkāya-dṛṣṭi)".

=== Mahaparinirvana Sutra ===
The Mahayana Mahaparinirvana Sutra lists approximately 50 kleshas, including those of attachment, aversion, stupidity, jealousy, pride, heedlessness, haughtiness, ill-will, quarrelsomeness, wrong livelihood, deceit, consorting with immoral friends, attachment to pleasure, to sleep, to eating, and to yawning; delighting in excessive talking and uttering lies, as well as thoughts of harm.

=== Two obscurations ===
Mahayana literature often features an enumeration of "two obscurations" (Wylie: sgrib gnyis), the "obscuration of conflicting emotions" (Sanskrit: kleśa-avaraṇa, Wylie: nyon-mongs-pa'i sgrib-ma) and the "obscuration concerning the knowable" (Sanskrit: jñeya-avaraṇa, Wylie: shes-bya'i sgrib-ma).

== Modern glosses ==
Modern translators have used many different English words to translate the term kleshas, such as: afflictions, passions, destructive emotions, disturbing emotions, etc.

The following table provides brief descriptions of the term kleshas given by various modern Buddhist teachers and scholars.

English/Sanskrit term used	Description	Source
Afflictive emotions	... those mind states that cause suffering, such as fear, hatred, anger, jealousy and so on – it's a long list!	Joseph Goldstein. The Emerging Western Buddhism: An Interview with Joseph Goldstein.
Afflictive emotions	In general, any defilement or emotion which obscures the mind. They are often summarized as three: ignorance, attachment and aversion. All other negative predispositions are produced on the basis of these three.	Khenchen Konchog Gyaltshen (2009). A Complete Guide to the Buddhist Path. p. 451 (from the glossary)
Afflictions	Mental factors that produce states of mental torment both immediately and in the long term. The five principal kleshas, which are sometimes called poisons, are attachment, aversion, ignorance, pride, and jealousy.	Longchen Yeshe Dorje (Kangyur Rinpoche) (2010). Treasury of Precious Qualities. p. 492 (from the glossary)
Conditioning Factors or Mental Afflictions	The processes that not only describe what we perceive, but also determine our responses.	Yongey Mingyur Rinpoche (2008). The Joy of Living. p. 115
Mental afflictions	In Tibetan a mental affliction is defined as a mental process that has the function of disrupting the equilibrium of the mind. They all have that in common, whether or not there is a strong emotional component to it.	Goleman, Daniel (2008). Destructive Emotions: A Scientific Dialogue with the Dalai Lama. Kindle Locations 2553–2555.
Destructive emotions	Fundamentally, a destructive emotion—which is also referred to as an ‘obscuring’ or ‘afflictive’ mental factor—is something that prevents the mind from ascertaining reality as it is. With a destructive emotion, there will always be a gap between the way things appear and the ways things are.	Goleman, Daniel (2008). Destructive Emotions: A Scientific Dialogue with the Dalai Lama. Kindle Locations 1779–1781.
Defilements	These are unskilful factors such as greed, hate, delusion, opinionatedness and lack of moral concern. Whereas the term ‘hindrance’ refers to five sticking points, ‘defilement’ is often used without any definite list, but to refer to any function of the mind which is led by unskilful factors.	Ajahn Sucitto (2011). Meditation, A Way of Awakening. Amaravati Publications. p. 263. (from the glossary)
Kleshas	Kleshas are the strong conflicting emotions that spin off and heighten when we get caught by aversion and attraction.	Pema Chodron. Signs of Spiritual Progress. Shambhala Sun.
Kleshas	Kleshas are properties that dull the mind and are the basis for all unwholesome actions. The three main kleshas are passion, aggression, and ignorance.	Chögyam Trungpa. The Truth of Suffering and the Path of Liberation. Edited by Judy L. Lief. Shambhala. p. 134 (from the glossary)
Kleshas	The basic idea is that certain powerful reactions have the capacity to take hold of us and drive our behavior. We believe in these reactions more than we believe in anything else, and they become the means by which we both hide from ourselves and attempt to cope with a world of ceaseless change and unpredictability. The three poisons of greed, hatred, and ignorance are the classic Buddhist examples, but others include conceit, skeptical doubt, and so-called "speculative" views ...	Mark Epstein. Going on Being: Buddhism and the Way of Change, a Positive Psychology for the West. http://www.quietspaces.com/kleshas.html
Kleshas	The emotional obscurations (in contrast to intellectual obscurations), usually translated as "poisons" or "defilements." The three main kleshas are ignorance, hatred, and desire. The five kleshas include these three along with pride and envy.	Thrangu Rinpoche (1993). The Practice of Tranquility & Insight: A Guide to Tibetan Buddhist Mediation (p. 152). Snow Lion. Kindle Edition. p. 152 (from the glossary)

== Overcoming the kleshas ==
All Buddhist schools teach that through Tranquility (Samatha) meditation the kilesas are pacified, though not eradicated, and through Insight (Vipassana) the true nature of the kilesas and the mind itself is understood. When the empty nature of the Self and the Mind is fully understood, there is no longer a root for the disturbing emotions to be attached to, and the disturbing emotions lose their power to distract the mind.

== Alternative translations ==
The term kleshas has been translated into English as:

- Afflictions
- Mental afflictions
- Mental disturbances
- Afflictive emotions
- Conditioning factors
- Destructive emotions
- Defiled emotions
- Defilements
- Dissonant emotions
- Disturbing emotions
- Disturbing emotions and attitudes
- Negative emotions
- Dissonant mental states
- Kleshas
- Passions
- Poisons
- Mind poisons
- Worldly desires

== See also ==
- Āsava
- Five hindrances
- Mental factors (Buddhism)
- Ten fetters (Buddhism)
- Three poisons (Buddhism)
- Bhavacakra
- Maya (illusion)
- Buddhism and psychology
- Kleshas (Hinduism)
- Six Enemies (Hinduism)
- Five Thieves (Sikhism)
- Kashaya (Jainism)
- Seven deadly sins
- Eight Dusts (Tenrikyo)

== Sources ==
- Bodhi, Bhikkhu (trans.) (2000). The Connected Discourses of the Buddha: A Translation of the Samyutta Nikaya. Boston: Wisdom Publications. ISBN 0-86171-331-1.
- Bodhi, Bhikkhu (2005). In the Buddha's Words. Boston: Wisdom Publications. ISBN 0-86171-491-1.
- Dictionary of Buddhism. Oxford University Press, 2003, 2004. Source: http://www.answers.com/topic/kle-a (accessed: January 5, 2008).
- Dzongsar Jamyang Khyentse (2011). What Makes You Not a Buddhist. Kindle Edition. Shambhala
- Epstein, Mark (2009). Going on Being: Buddhism and the Way of Change, a Positive Psychology for the West. Wisdom.
- Goldstein, Joseph. The Emerging Western Buddhism: An Interview with Joseph Goldstein. Insight Meditation Society website.
- Goleman, Daniel (2008). Destructive Emotions: A Scientific Dialogue with the Dalai Lama. Bantam. Kindle Edition.
- Guenther, Herbert V. & Leslie S. Kawamura (1975), Mind in Buddhist Psychology: A Translation of Ye-shes rgyal-mtshan's "The Necklace of Clear Understanding" Dharma Publishing. Kindle Edition.
- Khenchen Konchog Gyaltshen (2009). A Complete Guide to the Buddhist Path. Snow Lion.
- Longchen Yeshe Dorje (Kangyur Rinpoche) (2010). Treasury of Precious Qualities. Revised edition. Paperback. Shambhala.
- Muller, Charles (2004). The Yogācāra Two Hindrances and Their Reinterpretations in East Asia. Toyo Gakuen University. Source: http://www.acmuller.net/articles/reinterpretations_of_the_hindrances.html (accessed: January 5, 2008)
- Ñāṇamoli, Bhikkhu (trans.) (1991), The Path of Purification: Visuddhimagga. Seattle: BPS Pariyatti. ISBN 1-928706-00-2.
- Nyanatiloka Mahathera (1988). Buddhist Dictionary. Kandy: Buddhist Publication Society. An on-line search engine is available from "BuddhaSasana" at http://www.buddhanet.net/budsas/ebud/bud-dict/dic_idx.htm.
- Padmakara Translation Group (translator) (1998). The Words of My Perfect Teacher, by Patrul Rinpoche. Altamira.
- Patañjali (undated; author); Gabriel Pradīpaka & Andrés Muni (translators) (2007). Yogasūtra. Source: https://web.archive.org/web/20071222115211/http://www.sanskrit-sanscrito.com.ar/english/sanskrit_pronunciation/pronunciation7.html (accessed: November 23, 2007).
- Rhys Davids, T.W. & William Stede (eds.) (1921–5). The Pali Text Society’s Pali–English Dictionary. Chipstead: Pali Text Society. An on-line search engine is available from "U. Chicago" at http://dsal.uchicago.edu/dictionaries/pali/.
- Thanissaro Bhikkhu (trans.) (1994). Upakkilesa Samyutta: Defilements (SN 27.1–10). Retrieved 2008-02-10 from "Access to Insight" at http://www.accesstoinsight.org/tipitaka/sn/sn27/sn27.001-010.than.html.
- Thanissaro Bhikkhu (trans.) (2004). Ariyapariyesana Sutta: The Noble Search (MN 26). Retrieved 2010-03-20 from "Access to Insight" at http://www.accesstoinsight.org/tipitaka/mn/mn.026.than.html.
- Yongey Mingyur Rinpoche (2007). The Joy of Living. Kindle Edition. Harmony.
