= Arya (Buddhism) =

Buddhist term translated as "noble"

Translations of Arya
- English: noble not ordinary precious
- Sanskrit: आर्य
- Pali: ariya
- Burmese: အရိယာ
- Chinese: 聖 (Pinyin: shèng)
- Japanese: 聖 (Rōmaji: sei; shō)
- Tibetan: འཕགས་པ་ (Wylie: phags pa; THL: pakpa)

Arya (Sanskrit: आर्य pronounced ārya; Pāli: ariya) is a term used in Buddhism that can be translated as 'noble', 'not ordinary', 'valuable', 'precious', (Note: Ajahn Sucitto states: "So the four truths (ariya sacca) are generally called “noble” truths, although one might also translate ariya as “precious.” ") 'pure', 'rich'. Arya in the sense of 'noble' or 'exalted' is frequently used in Buddhist texts to designate a spiritual warrior or hero.

== Usage ==
The term is used in the following contexts:

- The Four Noble Truths are called the catvāry ārya satyāni (Sanskrit) or cattāri ariya saccāni (Pali).
- The Noble Eightfold Path is called the ārya mārga (Sanskrit, also āryāṣṭāṅgikamārga) or ariya magga (Pāli).
- Buddha's Dharma and Vinaya are the ariyassa dhammavinayo.
- In Buddhist texts, the āryas are those who have the Buddhist śīla (Pāli sīla, meaning "virtue") and follow the Buddhist path.
- Buddhists who have attained one of the four levels of awakening (stream-entry, once-returner, non-returner, arahant) are themselves called ariya puggalas (Arya persons).

In the context of the Four Noble Truths, contemporary scholars explain the meaning of ārya as follows:

- Paul Williams states: "The Aryas are the noble ones, the saints, those who have attained 'the fruits of the path', 'that middle path the Tathagata has comprehended which promotes sight and knowledge, and which tends to peace, higher wisdom, enlightenment, and Nibbana' (Narada 1980: 50).
- Geshe Tashi Tsering states: "The modifier noble [i.e. arya] means truth as perceived by arya beings, those beings who have had a direct realization of emptiness or selflessness. Noble means something seen by arya beings as it really is, and in this case it is four recognitions—suffering, origin, cessation, and path. Arya beings see all types of suffering—physical and mental, gross and subtle—exactly as they are, as suffering. For people like us, who do not have the direct realization of emptiness, although we may understand certain levels of physical and mental experiences as suffering, it is impossible for us to see all the levels of suffering for what they are. Instead we may see some things as desirable when in truth they are suffering."

Bhikkhu Bodhi explains: (Note: The Nobility of the Truths, by Bhikkhu Bodhi)

The word "noble," or ariya, is used by the Buddha to designate a particular type of person, the type of person which it is the aim of his teaching to create. In the discourses the Buddha classifies human beings into two broad categories. On one side there are the puthujjanas, the worldlings, those belonging to the multitude, whose eyes are still covered with the dust of defilements and delusion. On the other side there are the ariyans, the noble ones, the spiritual elite, who obtain this status not from birth, social station or ecclesiastical authority but from their inward nobility of character.

These two general types are not separated from each other by an impassable chasm, each confined to a tightly sealed compartment. A series of gradations can be discerned rising up from the darkest level of the blind worldling trapped in the dungeon of egotism and self-assertion, through the stage of the virtuous worldling in whom the seeds of wisdom are beginning to sprout, and further through the intermediate stages of noble disciples to the perfected individual at the apex of the entire scale of human development. This is the Arahant, the liberated one, who has absorbed the purifying vision of truth so deeply that all his defilements have been extinguished, and with them, all liability to suffering.

In Chinese Buddhist texts, ārya is translated as 聖 (approximately, "holy, sacred", pinyin shèng, on'yomi sei).

The spiritual character of the use of the term ārya in Buddhist texts can also be seen in the Mahavibhasa and in the Yogacarabhumi. The Mahāvibhasa states that only the noble ones (āryas) realize all four of the four noble truths (āryasatyāni) and that only a noble wisdom understands them fully. The same text also describes the āryas as the ones who "have understood and realized about the [truth of] suffering, (impermanence, emptiness, and no-self)" and who "understand things as they are". In another text, the Yogācārabhūmi (Taishō 1579, vol. xx, 364b10-15), the āryas are described as being free from the viparyāsas.

Several Buddhist texts show that the ārya dharma was taught to everybody, including the āryas, Dasyus, Devas, Gandharvas and Asuras. The Bhaiṣajyavastu (from the Mūlasarvāstivādavinaya) describes a story of Buddha teaching his dharma to the Four Heavenly Kings (Catvāraḥ Mahārājāḥ) of the four directions. In this story, the guardians of the east (Dhṛtarāṣṭra) and the south (Virūḍhaka) are āryajatiya (āryas) who speak Sanskrit, while the guardians of the west (Virūpākṣa) and the north (Vaiśravaṇa) are dasyujatiya (Dasyus) who speak Dasyu languages. In order to teach his Dharma, Buddha has to deliver his discourse in Aryan and Dasyu languages. This story describes Buddha teaching his Dharma to the āryas and Dasyus alike. The Karaṇḍavyūha (a Mahāyāna sūtra) describes how Avalokiteśvara taught the ārya Dharma to the asuras, yakṣas and rakṣasas.

In many parts of the South India, if somebody (new) is supposed to be addressed respectably, the prefix "Ayya", derived from "Arya" is used. South Indians used to call them "Arya" which is now transformed to "Ayya". This term is used even today.

== See also ==
- Arya
- Arya (name)

== Sources ==
- Ajahn Sumedho (2002), The Four Noble Truths, Amaravati Publications
- Ajahn Sucitto (2010), Turning the Wheel of Truth: Commentary on the Buddha's First Teaching, Shambhala
- Bronkhorst, J.; Deshpande, M.M., eds. (1999), Aryan and Non-Aryan in South Asia: Evidence, Interpretation, and Ideology, Department of Sanskrit and Indian Studies, Harvard University, ISBN 1-888789-04-2
- Geshe Tashi Tsering (2005), The Four Noble Truths: The Foundation of Buddhist Thought, Volume I, Wisdom, Kindle Edition
- Gethin, Rupert (1998), Foundations of Buddhism, Oxford University Press
- Goldstein, Joseph (2002), One Dharma: The Emerging Western Buddhism, HarperCollins
- Harvey, Peter (1990), Introduction to Buddhism, Cambridge University Press
- Lopez, Donald S. (2001), The Story of Buddhism, HarperCollins
- Mingyur Rinpoche (2007), The Joy of Living: Unlocking the Secret and Science of Happiness, Harmony Kindle Edition
- Moffitt, Philip (2008), Dancing with Life: Buddhist Insights for Finding Meaning and Joy in the Face of Suffering, Rodale, Kindle Edition
- Williams, Paul (2002), Buddhist Thought, Taylor & Francis, Kindle Edition
