= Fruits of the noble path =

Buddhist stages of enlightenment

In Buddhism, the fruits of the noble path (Sanskrit: āryamārgaphala, Pali: ariyamaggaphala; Tibetan: ’phags lam gyi ’bras bu; Chinese: shengdaoguo 聖道果) are four stages on the path to full awakening (bodhi).

These four fruits or states are Sotāpanna (stream-enterer), Sakadāgāmi (once-returner), Anāgāmi (non-returner), and Arahant (conqueror, "worthy one"). The early Buddhist texts portray the Buddha as referring to people who are at one of these four states as "noble ones" (ārya, Pāli: ariya) and the community of such persons as the noble sangha.

The teaching of the four stages of awakening was important to the early Buddhist schools and remains so in the Theravada school. It is also included in the Mahayana teachings on the various paths to awakening. However, their teaching on the bodhisattva path relies on different stages of awakening, called bodhisattva stages, which are taught as an alternative path.

== Outline ==
The four stages of awakening according to the Sutta Piṭaka.
| Outcome | Further rebirths | Abandoned fetters | |
|---|---|---|---|
| stream-enterer (sotāpanna) | up to seven, in earthly or heavenly realms | 1. identity view 2. doubt in Buddha; 3. clinging to rites; and ritual | lower fetters |
| once-returner (sakadagami) | one more, as a human | 1. identity view 2. doubt in Buddha; 3. clinging to rites; and ritual | lower fetters |
| non-returner (anāgāmi) | one more, in a pure abode | 4. sensual desire 5. ill will | lower fetters |
| arahant | none | 6. desire for; material rebirth 7. desire for immaterial rebirth 8. conceit 9. restlessness 10. ignorance | higher fetters |

In the Early Buddhist Texts, several types of Buddhist practitioners are described, according to their level of attainment. Those with no attainments are called puthujjanas (Sanskrit: pṛthagjana), i.e. the unenlightened commoners or "worldly" people. Those who have travelled a part of the path (magga) and attained the fruits of this path (phala), i.e. noble persons (ariya-puggala, aryas) are often categorized into a standard set of four ascending types, but there are also longer descriptions with more types.

The main four types are the Stream-enterer, Once-returner, Non-returner and the Arahant. Each class of noble person is defined according to which of the ten fetters they have eliminated from their mindstreams.

1. A "Stream-enterer" (Sotāpanna) is free from:

- 1. Identity view (Pali: sakkāya-diṭṭhi), the belief that there is an unchanging self or soul in the five impermanent skandhas.
- 2. Attachment to rites and rituals
- 3. Doubt about the teachings

2. A "Once-returner" (Sakadāgāmin) has greatly attenuated:

- 4. Sensual desire
- 5. Ill will

3. A "Non-returner" (Anāgāmi) is totally free from:

- 4. Sensual desire
- 5. Ill will

4. An Arahant is free from all of the five lower fetters and the five higher fetters, which are:

- 6. Attachment to the four meditative absorptions, which have form (rupa jhana)
- 7. Attachment to the four formless absorptions (ārupa jhana)
- 8. Conceit
- 9. Restlessness
- 10. Ignorance

== The ordinary person ==
An ordinary person who has not attained any of the four stages of awakening are called by the Pali term puthujjana or the Sanskrit pṛthagjana (पृथ, pṛthak, plus जन, jana, person). These are unenlightened commoners or "worldly" people trapped in the endless cycling of samsara in which the unenlightened will continue to be reborn into many different lives.

The doctrinal definition of an ordinary worldly person is any person with worldly desires and aspirations that is still bound by the ten fetters (saṃyojana). Thus, a common worldly person can be a non-buddhist layperson or sage, a buddhist lay follower (an upāsaka), or a monk that has not attained any stage of awakening. In contrast to them, a noble person (ārya-pudgala) has ended at least some of the fetters. Regarding the Sarvastivada and Mahayana scheme of the five paths (pañca-mārga), the term pṛthagjana refers to anyone who has not yet reached the third path, called the ‘path of seeing’ (darśana-mārga).

== The four stages of attainment ==
=== Stream-enterer ===
The first stage is that of Sotāpanna (Pali; Sanskrit: Srotāpanna), literally meaning "one who enters (āpadyate) the stream (sotas)," with the stream being the supermundane Noble Eightfold Path regarded as the highest Dharma. The stream-enterer is also said to have "opened the eye of the Dharma" (dhammacakkhu, Sanskrit: dharmacakṣus). A stream-enterer reaches arahantship within seven rebirths upon opening the eye of the Dharma.

Because the stream-enterer has attained an intuitive grasp of Buddhist doctrine (samyagdṛṣṭi or sammādiṭṭhi, "right view") and has complete confidence or Saddha in the Three Jewels: Buddha, Dharma, and Sangha, and has removed the sankharas that force rebirth in lower planes, that individual will not be reborn in any plane lower than the human (animal, preta, or in hell).

=== Once-returner ===
The second stage is that of the Sakadāgāmī (Sanskrit: Sakṛdāgāmin), literally meaning "one who once (sakṛt) comes (āgacchati)". The once-returner will at most return to the realm of the senses (the lowest being human and the highest being the devas wielding power over the creations of others) one more time. Both the stream-enterer and the once-returner have abandoned the first three fetters. The stream-enterer and once-returner are distinguished by the fact that the once-returner has weakened lust, hate, and delusion to a greater degree. The once-returner therefore has fewer than seven rebirths. Once-returners do not have only one more rebirth, as the name suggests, for that may not even be said with certainty about the non-returner who can take multiple rebirths in the five "Pure Abodes". They do, however, only have one more rebirth in the realm of the senses, excluding, of course, the planes of hell, animals and hungry ghosts. A stream-enterer, having abandoned the first three fetters, is guaranteed enlightenment within seven lifetimes, in the human or heavenly realms.

A once-returner is the next step up; they have reduced sensual desire and ill-will even further. Similarly, and therefore, incapable of being reborn in any of the lower realms.

=== Non-returner ===
The third stage is that of the Anāgāmī (Sanskrit: Anāgāmin), literally meaning "one who does not (an-) come (āgacchati)". The non-returner, having overcome sensuality, does not return to the human world, or any unfortunate world lower than that, after death. Instead, non-returners are reborn in one of the five special worlds in Rūpadhātu called the Śuddhāvāsa worlds, or "Pure Abodes", and there attain Nirvāṇa; Pāli: Nibbana; some of them are reborn a second time in a higher world of the Pure Abodes.

An Anāgāmī has abandoned the five lower fetters, out of ten total fetters, that bind beings to the cycle of rebirth. An Anāgāmī is well-advanced.

=== Arahant ===
The fourth stage is that of Arahant (Sanskrit: Arhat), a fully awakened person. They have abandoned all ten fetters and, upon death (Sanskrit: Parinirvāṇa, Pāli: Parinibbāna) will never be reborn in any plane or world, having wholly escaped saṃsāra. An Arahant has attained awakening by following the path given by the Buddha. In Theravada Buddhism the term Buddha is reserved for ones who "self-enlighten" such as Siddhartha Gautama Buddha, who discovered the path by himself.

== Types of noble ones ==
Buddhist sources also explain how there are different ways to attain the path. The main division of noble ones is between the dharmānusārin (Pāli: dhammānusāri) "follower of the Dharma", who attains the status of ārya through their understanding of the Dharma. This contrasts with the śraddhānusārin ("follower of faith"), whose spiritual practice and realization are based on trust and confidence in the teachings as presented by others.

Both the Sarvāstivāda tradition and the Theravāda tradition identify seven categories of noble individuals (ārya, Pāli: ariya) based on their progression in understanding and liberation. These are ranked according to their intellectual and spiritual development:

1. Śraddhānusārin (Pāli: saddhānusāri): the follower of faith.
2. Dharmānusārin (Pāli: dhammānusāri): the follower of the Dharma.
3. Śraddhāvimukta (Pāli: saddhāvimutta): one liberated through faith.
4. Dṛṣṭiprāpta (Pāli: diṭṭhippatta): one who has attained right view by cultivating both faith and wisdom.
5. Kāyasākṣin (Pāli: kāyasakkhi): one who directly experiences truth through bodily testimony, such as the meditative absorption in cessation (nirodhasamāpatti).
6. Prajñāvimukta (Pāli: paññāvimutta): one liberated through wisdom by means of analytical insight.
7. Ubhayatobhāgavimukta (Pāli: ubhatobhāgavimutta): one liberated both ways, through meditative absorption and wisdom.

== Sudden or gradual attainment ==
The Sutta Pitaka classifies the four levels according to the levels' attainments. The Sthaviravada and Mahīśāsaka schools of early Buddhism held that progress in understanding comes all at once, and that 'insight' (abhisamaya) does not come 'gradually' (successively – anapurva). The Mahāsāṃghika had the doctrine of ekaksana-citt, "according to which a Buddha knows everything in a single thought-instant." (Note: The same stance is taken in Chan Buddhism, although the Chán school harmonized this point of view with the need for gradual training after the initial insight. This "gradual training" is expressed in teachings as the Five ranks of enlightenment, Ten Ox-Herding Pictures which detail the steps on the Path, the Three Mysterious Gates of Linji, and the Four Ways of Knowing of Hakuin. The same stance is also taken in the contemporary Vipassana movement, especially the so-called "New Burmese Method".)

According to the Theravada exegesis, the process of becoming an Arahat is characterized by four distinct and sudden changes, although in the sutras it says that the path has a gradual development, with gnosis only after a long stretch, just as the ocean has a gradual shelf, a gradual inclination with a sudden drop only after a long stretch.

== Sources ==
- Gomez, Luis O. (1991), "Purifying Gold: The Metaphor of Effort and Intuition in Buddhist Thought and Practice", in Gregory, Peter N. (ed.), Sudden and Gradual: Approaches to Enlightenment in Chinese Thought, Delhi: Motilal Banarsidass Publishers
- Warder, A. K. (2000), Indian Buddhism, Delhi: Motilal Banarsidass Publishers
