= Five hindrances =

In Buddhism, mental obstacles to meditation and well-being in daily life

In the Buddhist tradition, the five hindrances (Sinhala: පඤ්ච නීවරණ, romanized: pañca nīvaraṇa; Pali: pañca nīvaraṇāni) are identified as mental factors that hinder progress in meditation and in daily life. In the Theravada tradition, these factors are identified specifically as obstacles to the jhānas (stages of concentration) within meditation practice. Contemporary Insight Meditation teachers identify the five hindrances as obstacles to mindfulness meditation.

Within the Mahayana tradition, the five hindrances are obstacles to samadhi. They are part of the two types of obstructions (Sanskrit: āvaraṇa), i.e. the obstacles to Buddhahood. The two types of obstructions are afflictive obstructions (Sanskrit: kleśāvaraṇa, which include the standard five hindrances) and cognitive obstructions (jñeyāvaraṇa, which can only be removed by bodhisattvas).

The classic list of five hindrances is:

1. Sensory desire (kāmacchanda): seeking for pleasure through the five senses of sight, sound, smell, taste and physical feeling.
2. Ill-will (vyāpāda; also spelled byāpāda): feelings of hostility, resentment, hatred and bitterness.
3. Sloth-and-torpor (thīna-middha): half-hearted action with little or no effort or concentration.
4. Restlessness-and-worry (uddhacca-kukkucca): the inability to calm the mind and focus one's energy.
5. Doubt (vicikiccha): lack of conviction or trust in one's abilities.

== Etymology ==
According to Gil Fronsdal, the Pali term nīvaraṇa means covering. Fronsdal states that these hindrances cover over: the clarity of our mind, and our ability to be mindful, wise, concentrated, and stay on purpose.

According to Rhys Davids, the Pali term nīvaraṇa (Sanskrit: nivāraṇa) refers to an obstacle or hindrance only in the ethical sense, and is usually enumerated in a set of five.

== In Pali Literature ==
=== In the Pali Canon ===
In the Pali Canon's Samyutta Nikaya, several discourses juxtapose the five hindrances with the seven factors of enlightenment (bojjhanga). (Note: For example, in Samyutta Nikaya chapter 46, Bojjhanga-samyutta, discourses 46.31 through 46.40 are based on this juxtaposition (Bodhi (2000), pp. 1589–94).) For instance, according to SN 46.37, the Buddha stated:

Bhikkhus, there are these five obstructions, hindrances, corruptions of the mind, weakeners of wisdom. What five? Sensual desire... ill will... sloth and torpor ... restlessness and remorse... doubt...

There are, bhikkhus, these seven factors of enlightenment, which are nonobstructions, nonhindrances, noncorruptions of the mind; when developed and cultivated they lead to the realization of the fruit of true knowledge and liberation. What seven? The enlightenment factor of mindfulness... equanimity... (Note: Bodhi (2000) elides the middle five factors of enlightenment since all seven factors of enlightenment are identified previously multiple times in Bodhi's text.)

Anālayo underlines:

To overcome the hindrances, to practise satipatthana, and to establish the awakening factors are, indeed, according to several Pali discourses, the key aspects and the distinctive features common to the awakenings of all Buddhas, past, present, and future.

Anālayo further supports this by identifying that, in all extant Sanskrit and Chinese versions of the Satipatthana Sutta, only the five hindrances and seven factors of enlightenment are consistently identified under the dhamma contemplation section; contemplations of the five aggregates, six sense bases and Four Noble Truths are not included in one or more of these non-Pali versions.

In terms of gaining insight into and overcoming the Five Hindrances, according to the Satipatthana Sutta, the Buddha proclaimed:

How, monks, does a monk live contemplating mental objects in the mental objects of the five hindrances?

Herein, monks, when sense-desire is present, a monk knows, "There is sense-desire in me," or when sense-desire is not present, he knows, "There is no sense-desire in me." He knows how the arising of the non-arisen sense-desire comes to be; he knows how the abandoning of the arisen sense-desire comes to be; and he knows how the non-arising in the future of the abandoned sense-desire comes to be.

Each of the remaining four hindrances are similarly treated in subsequent paragraphs.

The Buddha gives the following analogies in the Samaññaphala Sutta (DN 2, "The Fruits of the Contemplative Life"):

[W]hen these five hindrances are not abandoned in himself, the monk regards it as a debt, a sickness, a prison, slavery, a road through desolate country. But when these five hindrances are abandoned in himself, he regards it as unindebtedness, good health, release from prison, freedom, a place of security.

Similarly, in the Saṅgārava Sutta (SN 46.55), the Buddha compares sensual desire with looking for a clear reflection in water mixed with lac, turmeric and dyes; ill will with boiling water; sloth-and-torpor with water covered with plants and algae; restlessness-and-worry with wind-churned water; and, doubt with water that is "turbid, unsettled, muddy, placed in the dark."

=== From post-canonical Pali literature ===
	method of suppression	path of eradication
sensual desire	first jhana based on bodily foulness	nonreturning or arahantship (Note: Upatissa (1995), p. 316, identifies that sense-desire is "destroyed through the Path of Non-Return." In the context of commenting on sutta SN 46.55, Bodhi (2005), p. 440, n. 14, states that sensual desire is "eradicated by the path of arahantship (since kāmacchanda is here interpreted widely enough to include desire for any object, not only sensual desire)".)
ill will	first jhana based on metta	nonreturning
sloth and torpor	perception of light	arahantship
restlessness and worry	serenity (samatha)	arahantship and nonreturning
doubt	defining of phenomena (dhammavavatthāna)	stream-entry
The Pali commentary's methods and paths for escaping the hindrances.

According to the first-century CE exegetic Vimuttimagga, the five hindrances include all ten fetters: sense desire includes any attachment to passion; ill will includes all unwholesome states of hatred; and, sloth and torpor, restlessness and worry, and doubt include all unwholesome states of infatuation. The Vimuttimagga further distinguishes that "sloth" refers to mental states while "torpor" refers to physical states resultant from food or time or mental states; if torpor results from food or time, then one diminishes it through energy; otherwise, one removes it with meditation. In addition, the Vimuttimagga identifies four types of doubt:

- doubt regarding self is a hindrance to tranquility;
- doubt regarding the Four Noble Truths and three worlds is a hindrance to insight;
- doubt regarding the Triple Gem is a hindrance to both tranquility and insight;
- doubt regarding places and people is a hindrance to "non-doctrinal" things;
- doubt regarding the Discourses is a hindrance to solitude.

According to Buddhaghosa's fifth-century CE commentary to the Samyutta Nikaya (Sāratthappakāsinī), one can momentarily escape the hindrances through jhanic suppression or through insight while, as also stated in the Vimuttimagga, one eradicates the hindrances through attainment of one of the four stages of enlightenment (see Table 1). (Note: Regarding the Sāratthappakāsinī commentary, see Bodhi (2005), p. 440, n. 14 Regarding the Vimuttimagga commentary, see Upatissa (1995), p. 316)

The five mental factors that counteract the five hindrances, according to the Theravada tradition:

1. vitakka ("applied thought", "coarse examination") counteracts sloth-torpor (lethargy and drowsiness)
2. vicāra ("sustained thought", "precise investigation") counteracts doubt (uncertainty)
3. pīti (rapture, well-being) counteracts ill-will (malice)
4. sukha (non-sensual pleasure) counteracts restlessness-worry (excitation and anxiety)
5. ekaggatā (one-pointedness, single-pointed attention) counteracts sensory desire

== Mahāyāna ==
Mahāyāna Buddhist thought focuses on the concept of the āvaraṇas (Sanskrit, “obstruction” or “hindrance”; Tibetan: sgrib pa; Chinese: zhang) refers to impediments on the path to Buddhahood. Mahāyāna Buddhism recognizes two primary types of āvaraṇa:

- Afflictive Obstructions (Kleśāvaraṇa): These arise from defilements such as anger, envy, and ignorance, which result in unwholesome actions. They can be overcome by Śrāvakas, Pratyekabuddhas, and beginner Bodhisattvas through antidotes (pratipakṣa) and lead to freedom from rebirth.
- Cognitive Obstructions (Jñeyāvaraṇa): These stem from misconceptions about reality, such as reifying imaginary phenomena, and result in pride, wrong views, and discrimination. Only advanced bodhisattvas can overcome these obstacles, attaining complete understanding of emptiness (śūnyatā) and compassion (karuṇā) while accumulating merit (puṇya).

Afflictive obstructions hinder liberation, while cognitive obstructions block omniscience. Buddhas alone transcend both, achieving complete insight into all objects of knowledge. In Yogācāra sources, cognitive obstructions are linked to mistaken perceptions and conceptualizations. These are addressed through advanced practices on the Bodhisattva path, including mastery of the six perfections (pāramitās).

According to Xuanzang's Cheng Weishi Lun (Vijñaptimātratāsiddhi), there are ten specific āvaraṇas which correspond to the stages of the Bodhisattva path (daśabhūmi). These are:

1. Obstruction of common delusions (prithagjanatvāvaraṇa): Overcome through generosity.
2. Obstruction of deluded conduct (mithyāpratipattyāvaraṇa): Addressed by morality.
3. Obstruction of dullness (dhandhatvāvaraṇa): Resolved with patience.
4. Obstruction of subtle afflictions (sūkṣmakleśasamudācārāvaraṇa): Countered by effort.
5. Obstruction of the lesser nirvāṇa ideal (hīnayānaparinirvāṇāvaraṇa): Overcome through meditative absorption.
6. Obstruction of coarse characteristics (sthūlanimittasamudācārāvaraṇa): Addressed by wisdom.
7. Obstruction of subtle characteristics (sūkṣmanimittasamudācārāvaraṇa): Overcome by expedient means.
8. Obstruction of continued activity in the immaterial realm (nirnimittābhisaṃskārāvaraṇa): Resolved through vows.
9. Obstruction of reluctance to save others (parahitacaryākāmanāvaraṇa): Countered by spiritual power.
10. Obstruction of incomplete mastery over all phenomena (dharmasvāśitāpratilambhāvaraṇa): Addressed by omniscience.

== See also ==
- Five Thieves (in Sikhism)
- Five faults and eight antidotes
- Five precepts
- Jhana
- Pāramitā (the virtues, either six or ten)
- Three poisons
- Kleshas (Buddhism)
- Seven Factors of Awakening
