= Sotāpanna =

One without the first 3 fetters in Buddhism

In Buddhism, a sotāpanna (Pali) or srotāpanna (Sanskrit)—translated variously as "stream-enterer", "stream-entrant" or "stream-winner"—is one who has reached the first of the four stages of enlightenment. Stream entry is purportedly followed by three subsequent stages of awakening: Sakadāgāmi (once-returner), Anāgāmi (non-returner), and Arahant (fully liberated).

The word sotāpanna literally means "one who entered (āpanna) the stream (sota); stream-enterer", after a metaphor which calls the noble eightfold path a stream which leads to a vast ocean, nibbāna. It describes a person who has grasped the dharma and thereby dropped the first three fetters (Pāli: samyojana), namely self-view (sakkāya-ditthi), skeptical indecision (vicikicchā), and clinging to rites and rituals (sīlabbata-parāmāsa). A stream entrant is said to be free from possible rebirth in one of the three lower realms.

== Attainment ==
Having dropped the first three fetters, a person who has just begun on the path of stream-entry (sotāpatti-magga) is called a sotāpanna.

The sotāpanna is said to attain an intuitive grasp of the dharma—this wisdom being called right view (sammā diṭṭhi)—and has unshakable confidence in the Buddha, Dharma, and Sangha; this trio is sometimes taken to be the triple refuge, and are at other times listed as being objects of recollection. In general though, confirmed confidence in the Buddha, Dharma, and Sangha is considered to be one of the four limbs of stream-winning (sotāpannassa angāni). The sotāpanna is said to have "opened the eye of the Dhamma" (dhammacakkhu), because they have realized that whatever arises will cease (impermanence). Their conviction in the true Dharma would at this point be unshakable.

The sotāpanna has had their first glimpse of the unconditioned element, the asankhata, in which they see the goal, in the moment of the fruition of their path (magga-phala). Whereas the stream-entrant has seen nibbāna and therefore has verified confidence in it, the arahant can drink fully of its waters, to use a simile from the Kosambi Sutta (SN 12.68) of a "well" encountered along a desert road. The sotāpanna "may state this about himself: 'Hell is ended; animal wombs are ended; the state of the hungry shades is ended; states of deprivation, destitution, the bad bourns are ended! I am a stream-winner, steadfast, never again destined for states of woe, headed for self-awakening!'"

The remaining three paths—namely: once-return (sakadāgāmin), non-return (anāgāmin), and sainthood (arahatta)—become "destined" (sammatta niyāma) for the stream-entrant, whose enlightenment as a disciple (ariya-sāvaka) becomes inevitable within seven lives transmigrating among gods and humans. If they are diligent (appamatta, appamāda) in the practice of the Teacher's (satthāra) message, they may fully awaken within their present life. They have very little future suffering to undergo.

The early Buddhist texts (e.g. the Ratana Sutta) say that a stream-entrant will no longer be born in the animal womb, or hell realms, nor as a hungry ghost. The pathways to unfortunate rebirth destinations (duggati) have been closed to them.

Joy Manné notes that early Buddhist texts spoke of two stages, a 'convert', who has just joined the community, and the arhat, who is liberated. As the account of Buddhist praxis developed, two extra steps were added and the 'convert' stage became known as sotāpanna.

According to Theravada Buddhism, in the period of 5,000 years after the parinirvana of Buddha, we can still attain sotāpanna or even Arhat through practicing satipatthana, and satipatthana is the only way out.

=== Three fetters ===
The four stages of awakening according to the Sutta Piṭaka.
Outcome	Further rebirths	Abandoned fetters	
stream-enterer (sotāpanna)	up to seven, in earthly or heavenly realms	1. identity view 2. doubt in Buddha; 3. clinging to rites; and ritual	lower fetters
once-returner (sakadagami)	one more, as a human	1. identity view 2. doubt in Buddha; 3. clinging to rites; and ritual	lower fetters
non-returner (anāgāmi)	one more, in a pure abode	4. sensual desire 5. ill will	lower fetters
arahant	none	6. desire for; material rebirth 7. desire for immaterial rebirth 8. conceit 9. restlessness 10. ignorance	higher fetters

In the Pali Canon, the qualities of a sotāpanna are described as:

...those monks who have abandoned (the first) three fetters, are all stream-winners, certain, never again destined for the lower realms, headed for self-awakening. This is how the Dhamma well-proclaimed by me is clear, open, evident, stripped of rags.

— Alagaddupama Sutta

The three fetters which the sotāpanna eradicates are:

1. Self-view — The view of substance, or that what is compounded (sankhata), could be eternal in the five aggregates (form, feelings, perception, intentions, cognizance) and thus possessed or owned as 'I', 'me', or 'mine'. A sotāpanna lacks a view about self (sakkāya-ditthi) because this view is proclaimed to be a subtle form of clinging.
2. Clinging to rites and rituals — The view that one becomes pure simply through performing rituals (animal sacrifices, ablutions, chanting, etc.), adhering to rigid moralism, or relying on a god for non-causal delivery (issara nimmāna). Rites and rituals now function more to obscure than to support the right view of the sotāpanna's now-opened dharma eye. The sotāpanna realizes that deliverance can be won only through the practice of the Noble Eightfold Path. It is the elimination of the notion that there are shortcuts to perfecting all virtues.
3. Skeptical doubt (Note: The English term doubt is used here in a different sense than in the common English usage. In particular, it does not mean a weak desire to be Buddhist, or a weak knowledge of the letter of the scriptures. Letting go of the delusions leads to an authentic view of reality, so the person becomes a witness that the teachings are true. Lack of doubt literally means that the belief is now unbreakable, but it is more accurate to say that it has been replaced by knowledge.) (Vicikitsa) — Doubt about the Buddha, his teaching (dharma), and his community (sangha) is eradicated because the sotāpanna personally experiences the true nature of reality through insight, and this insight confirms the accuracy of the Buddha's teaching. Seeing removes doubt, because the sight is a form of vision (dassana), that allows one to know (ñāṇa).

=== Defilements ===
According to the Pali commentary, six types of defilement are eventually abandoned by a sotāpanna:

1. Envy
2. Jealousy
3. Hypocrisy
4. Fraud
5. Denigration
6. Domineering

=== Rebirth ===
A sotāpanna is safe from falling into the states of misery (they will not be born as an animal, ghost, or hell being). Their lust, hatred, and delusion are not strong enough to cause rebirth in the lower realms. A sotāpanna will have to be reborn at most only seven more times in the human or heavenly worlds before attaining nibbāna. It is not necessary for a sotāpanna to be reborn seven more times before attaining nibbāna, as an ardent practitioner may progress to the higher stages in the same life in which he/she reaches the sotāpanna level by making an aspiration and persistent effort to reach the final goal of nibbāna.

According to Buddha, there are three types of sotāpannas, classifiable according to their possible rebirths:

1. "If a man, after the disappearance of the 3 fetters [the samyojana: personality-belief, skeptical doubt, attachment to rules and rituals], has entered the stream [to Nibbāna], he is no more subject to rebirth in lower worlds, is firmly established, destined to full enlightenment. After having passed amongst the heavenly and human beings only seven times more through the round of rebirths, he puts an end to suffering. Such a man is called 'one with 7 births at the utmost' [sattakkhattu-parama]."
2. "If a man, after the disappearance of the 3 fetters.... is destined to full enlightenment, he, after having passed among noble families two or three times through the round of rebirths, puts an end to suffering. Such a man is called 'one passing from one noble family to another' [kolankola]."
3. "If a man, after the disappearance of the 3 fetters.... is destined to full enlightenment, he, after having only once more returned to human existence, puts an end to suffering. Such a man is called 'one germinating only once more' [eka-bījī]."

=== Six actions that are not committed ===
A sotāpanna will not commit six wrong actions:

1. Murdering one's own mother.
2. Murdering one's own father.
3. Murdering an arahant.
4. Maliciously injuring the Buddha to the point of drawing blood.
5. Deliberately creating a schism in the monastic community.
6. Taking another Teacher [besides Buddha].

== Textual references ==
=== Suttas ===
The Buddha spoke favorably about the sotāpanna on many occasions. Even though it is (only) the first of ariya sangha members, he or she is welcomed by all other sangha members for he or she practices for the benefit and welfare of many. In the literature, the arya sangha is described as "the four" when taken as pairs, and as "the eight" when taken as individual types. This refers to the four supra-mundane fruits (attainments: "phala") and the corresponding four supra-mundane paths (of those practicing to attain those fruits: "magga").

"The Sangha of the Blessed One's disciples who have practiced well... who have practiced straight-forwardly... who have practiced methodically... who have practiced masterfully — in other words, the four types [of noble disciples] when taken as pairs, the eight when taken as individual types — they are the Sangha of the Blessed One's disciples: worthy of gifts, worthy of hospitality, worthy of offerings, worthy of respect, the incomparable field of merit for the world."

— Anguttara Nikaya, 11.12

This is called "the recollection of the Sangha" (sanghanussati). It can also be interpreted as: "They are the Blessed One's disciples, who have practiced well, who have practiced directly, who have practiced insight-fully, those who practice with integrity (to share what they have learned with others). They give occasion for incomparable goodness to arise in the world because gifts to them bear great fruit and benefit to the giver."

The fifty-fifth Samyutta of the Samyutta Nikaya is called the "Sotāpatti-saṃyutta", and concerns sotāpannas and their attainment. In that chapter's discourse-numbers 1–4, 6–9, 11–14, 16–20, 22–36, 39–49, 51, 53, and 54, sotāpannas are praised as sangha members—by and to: the sick, lay followers, people on their deathbed, bhikkhunis, bhikkhus, and devas—and end up becoming the well-being and benefit of many.

=== Dhammapada ===
From Dhammapada verse 178:

Sole dominion over the earth,
going to heaven,
lordship over all worlds:
the fruit of stream-entry
excels them.

== Chan ==
See also Sudden Enlightenment

According to Mahāyāna Master Bhikshu Hsuan Hua's commentary on the Vajra Sutra,

A Shrotaapanna is a first stage Arhat. Certification to the first fruit of Arhatship, which is within the Small Vehicle, comes when the eighty-eight categories of view delusions are smashed.

Hsuan Hua continues:

The first fruit is that of Śrotāpanna, a Sanskrit word which means "One Who Has Entered the Flow." He opposes the flow of common people's six dusts and enters the flow of the sage's dharma-nature. Entering the flow means entering the state of the accomplished sage of the Small Vehicle.

== See also ==
- Four stages of enlightenment
