= Buddhist views on sin =

There are a few differing Buddhist views on sin. American Zen author Brad Warner states that in Buddhism there is no concept of sin at all. The Buddha Dharma Education Association also expressly states "The idea of sin or original sin has no place in Buddhism." Zen student and author Barbara O'Brien has said that "Buddhism has no concept of sin." Walpola Rahula also disagreed with the notion of sin, saying "In fact there is no 'sin' in Buddhism, as sin is understood in some religions."

Ethnologist Christoph von Fürer-Haimendorf explained,

In Buddhist thinking the whole universe, men as well as gods, are subject to a reign of law. Every action, good or bad, has an inevitable and automatic effect in a long chain of causes, an effect which is independent of the will of any deity. Even though this may leave no room for the concept of 'sin' in the sense of an act of defiance against the authority of a personal god, Buddhists speak of 'sin' when referring to transgressions against the universal moral code. (1974: 550)

Chögyam Trungpa specifically disagreed with the notion of "original sin" saying

The problem with this notion of original sin or mistake is that it acts very much as a hinderance [sic] to people. At some point it is of course necessary to realize one's shortcomings. But if one goes too far with that, it kills any inspiration and can destroy one's vision as well. So in that way, it really is not helpful, and in fact it seems unnecessary.

== Anantarika-karma ==
Anantarika-karma in Theravada Buddhism is a heinous crime that, through karmic process, brings immediate disaster. In Mahayana Buddhism, these five crimes are referred to as pañcānantarya (Pāli), and are mentioned in The Sutra Preached by the Buddha on the Total Extinction of the Dharma. They are considered so heinous that a Buddhist or a non Buddhist should avoid them. According to Buddhism, committing such a crime would prevent them attaining the stages of Sotapanna, Sakadagami, Anagami, or Arhat in that lifetime. The five crimes or sins are:

1. Injuring a Buddha
2. Killing an Arhat
3. Creating schism in the society of Sangha
4. Matricide
5. Patricide
