= Anāgāmi =

3rd of the four stages of enlightment in Buddhism

Translations of Anāgāmin
- English: Non-returner
- Sanskrit: अनागामिन् (IAST: Anāgāmin)
- Pali: Anāgāmī
- Chinese: 不還 or 阿那含 (Pinyin: bùhuán or Ānàhán)
- Japanese: 不還 or 阿那含 (Rōmaji: fugen or anagon)
- Korean: 불환 or 아나함 (RR: bulhwan or anaham)
- Tagalog: Anagami
- Tibetan: ཕྱིར་མི་འོང་བ་ Wylie: phyir mi 'ong ba THL: chir mi ongwa
- Thai: อนาคามี (RTGS: anakhami)
- Vietnamese: Bất hoàn or A-na-hàm

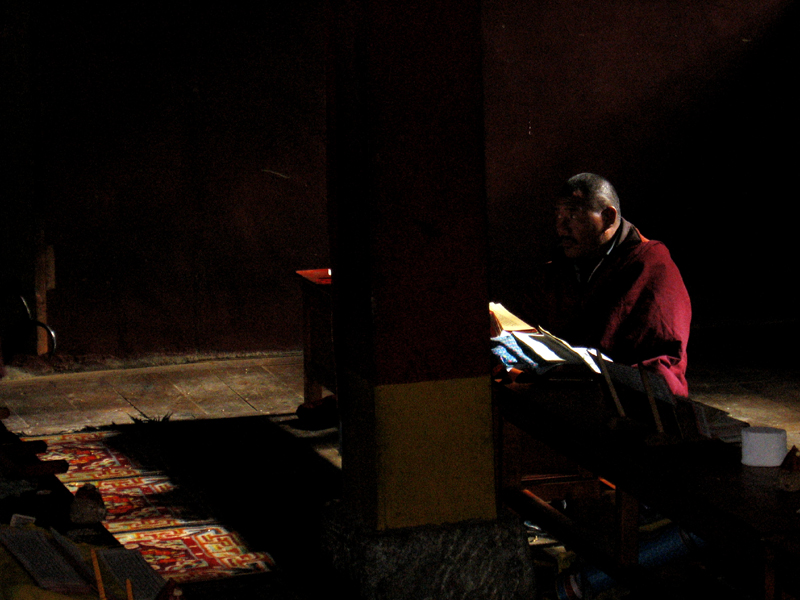
Anagami

In Buddhism, particularly Theravāda Buddhism, an anāgāmin (अनागामिन्, anāgāmin; Pāli: anāgāmī; literally "non-returner") is a partially enlightened person who has severed the first five fetters (saṃyojana) binding the ordinary mind and has reached the third of the four stages of enlightenment, or the third stage of the path towards attainment (ārya-mārga).

An anāgāmin is so called because, after death, such a person does not "return" to rebirth in the human world. Since the anāgāmin has not yet become free from the bond of existence (bhava-yoga), however, existence continues in a higher realm: the person is reborn in the heaven of the Pure Abodes, where only anāgāmins reside, and there ultimately attains full enlightenment, or arahantship.

== Requisites for becoming an anāgāmin ==
The four stages of awakening according to the Sutta Piṭaka
Outcome	Further rebirths	Abandoned fetters	
stream-enterer (sotāpanna)	up to seven, in earthly or heavenly realms	1. identity view 2. doubt in Buddha; 3. clinging to rites; and ritual	lower fetters
once-returner (sakadagami)	one more, as a human	1. identity view 2. doubt in Buddha; 3. clinging to rites; and ritual	lower fetters
non-returner (anāgāmi)	one more, in a pure abode	4. sensual desire 5. ill will	lower fetters
arahant	none	6. desire for; material rebirth 7. desire for immaterial rebirth 8. conceit 9. restlessness 10. ignorance	higher fetters

An anāgāmin is free from the lowest five chains or fetters (Sanskrit: pañcāvarabhāgīya-saṃyojana; Pali: pañcorambhāgiyāni-saṃyojanāni; 五下分結) which are as follows:

1. Belief in ātma or ego/self (Sanskrit: satkāya-dṛṣṭi or svakāya-dṛṣṭi; Pāli: sakkāya-diṭṭhi; 有身見)
2. Attachment to rites and rituals (Sanskrit: śīlavrata-parāmarśa-dṛṣṭi; Pāli: sīlabbata-parāmāsa-diṭṭhi; 戒禁取見)
3. Skeptical doubt (Sanskrit: vicikitsā; Pali: vicikicchā; 疑)
4. Sensuous craving (kāmarāga; 欲貪)
5. Ill will or aversion (vyāpāda or byāpāda; 瞋恚)

The remaining five higher fetters (Sanskrit: pañca-ūrdhvabhāgiya-saṃyojana; Pali: pañcuddhambhāgiyāni-saṃyojanāni; 五上分結) from which an anāgāmin is not yet free are:

1. Craving for fine-material existence (the first 4 jhanas) (rūparāga; 色貪)
2. Craving for immaterial existence (the last 4 jhanas) (arūparāga; 無色貪)
3. Conceit or pride (māna; 慢)
4. Restlessness (Sanskrit: auddhatya; Pali: uddhacca; 掉挙)
5. Ignorance (Sanskrit: avidyā; Pali: avijjā; 無明)

Kāmarāga and vyāpāda, which they are free from, can also be interpreted as craving for becoming and non-becoming, respectively.

Anāgāmins are at an intermediate stage between the sakṛdāgāmin and the arhat. An arhat enjoys complete freedom from the ten fetters, while an anāgāmin's mind remains very pure.

== Five types of anāgāmin ==
The Pali Puggalapannatti and the Sanskrit texts Mahāprajñāpāramitāśāstra and the Sarvāstivādin-Vaibhaṣika Abhidharma both describe five classes of anāgāmin. When an anāgāmin is reborn in the Pure Abodes, one of the five following scenarios will occur:

1. He will attain arhatship immediately after rebirth or within the first half of his life in the Pure Abodes. Such a being is called "one who reaches Nibbāna within the first half of the life" (Sanskrit: antarāparinirvāyin; Pali: antarā-parinibbāyī).
2. He will attain arhatship within the latter half of his life in the Pure Abodes or at the moment of death. Such a being is called "one who reaches Nibbāna after crossing half the life-time" (Sanskrit: upapadyaparinirvāyin; Pali: upahacca-parinibbāyī).
3. He exerts himself to the point of attaining arhatship. Such a being is called "one who reaches Nibbāna with exertion" (Sanskrit: sābhisaṃskāraparinirvāyin; Pali: sasankhāra-parinibbāyī).
4. He does not exert himself, yet attains arhatship. Such a being is called "one who reaches Nibbāna without exertion" (Sanskrit: anabhisaṃskāraparinirvāyin; Pali: asankhāra-parinibbāyī).
5. He traverses the five heavens of the Pure Abodes in order from lowest to highest before attaining arhatship. Such a being is called "one who passes up-stream to the highest gods" (Sanskrit: ūrdhvasrotas; Pali: uddhamsota-akanittha-gāmī)."

== Anāgāmins in literature ==
Several figures who appear in the literature achieve the state of an anāgāmin. Some of these people include:

- The Brahmin Bāvarī
- The householder Uggata
- The wandering ascetic Subhadda
- The monk Pukkusāti
- The nun Nandā
- The laywoman Matikamata
- The layman Citta
- The layman Visākha
- The householder Sandhāna
- The Brahman Uṇṇābha
- Ghatikara the Potter, a lay follower of the Kāśyapa Buddha

== See also ==
- Four stages of enlightenment
- Fetter (Buddhism)

== Sources ==
- Thomas Rhys Davids & William Stede (eds.) (1921-5). The Pali Text Society's Pali–English Dictionary. Chipstead: Pali Text Society. A general on-line search engine for the PED is available at http://dsal.uchicago.edu/dictionaries/pali/.
