= Fetter (Buddhism) =

Concept in Buddhism

Translations of saṃyojana
- English: fetter
- Sanskrit: संयोजन (IAST: saṃyojana)
- Pali: saṃyojana
- Bengali: বন্ধন (bandhana)
- Burmese: သံယောဇဉ် (MLCTS: san yaw jan)
- Chinese: 結 (Pinyin: jié)
- Indonesian: belenggu
- Japanese: 結 (Rōmaji: yui)
- Korean: 결 (RR: gyeol)
- Lao: ປຸຖຸຊົນ (pu thu son)
- Sinhala: දස සංයෝජන
- Thai: สังโยชน์ (IPA: sǎŋ jôːt)
- Vietnamese: kiết sử

In Buddhism, a mental fetter, chain or bond (Pāli: samyojana, Sanskrit: संयोजना, romanized: saṃyojana) shackles a sentient being to saṃsāra, the cycle of lives with dukkha. By cutting through all fetters, one attains nibbāna (Pali; Skt.: निर्वाण, nirvāṇa).

== Fetter of suffering ==
Throughout the Pali canon, the word "fetter" is used to describe an intrapsychic phenomenon that ties one to suffering. For example, in the Itivuttaka, the Buddha says:

"Monks, I don't envision even one other fetter — fettered by which beings conjoined go wandering and transmigrating on for a long, long time—like the fetter of craving (taṇhā). Fettered with the fetter of craving, beings conjoined go wandering & transmigrating on for a long, long time.

— Buddha, in Khuddaka Nikaya, Itivuttaka 1.15

Elsewhere, the suffering caused by a fetter is implied as in this more technical discourse from Samyutta Nikaya 35.232, where Ven. Sariputta converses with Ven. Kotthita:

Ven. Kotthita: "How is it, friend Sariputta, is ... the ear the fetter of sounds or are sounds the fetter of the ear?..."
Ven. Sariputta: "Friend Kotthita, the ... ear is not the fetter of sounds nor are sounds the fetter of the ear, but rather the desire and lust that arise there in dependence on both: that is the fetter there...."

— Samyutta Nikaya

== Lists of fetters ==
The fetters are enumerated in different ways in the Pali canon's Sutta Pitaka and Abhidhamma Pitaka.

=== Sutta Pitaka's list of ten fetters ===
The Pali canon's Sutta Pitaka identifies ten "fetters of becoming":

1. belief in a self (Pali: sakkāya-diṭṭhi)
2. doubt or uncertainty, especially about the Buddha's awakeness (vicikicchā)
3. attachment to rites and rituals (sīlabbata-parāmāsa)
4. sensual desire (kāmacchando)
5. ill will (vyāpādo or byāpādo)
6. lust for material existence, lust for material rebirth (rūparāgo)
7. lust for immaterial existence, lust for rebirth in a formless realm (arūparāgo)
8. conceit (māna)
9. restlessness (uddhacca)
10. ignorance (avijjā)

The four stages of awakening according to the Sutta Piṭaka
Outcome	Further rebirths	Abandoned fetters	
stream-enterer (sotāpanna)	up to seven, in earthly or heavenly realms	1. identity view 2. doubt in Buddha; 3. clinging to rites; and ritual	lower fetters
once-returner (sakadagami)	one more, as a human	1. identity view 2. doubt in Buddha; 3. clinging to rites; and ritual	lower fetters
non-returner (anāgāmi)	one more, in a pure abode	4. sensual desire 5. ill will	lower fetters
arahant	none	6. desire for; material rebirth 7. desire for immaterial rebirth 8. conceit 9. restlessness 10. ignorance	higher fetters

As indicated in the adjacent table, throughout the Sutta Pitaka, the first five fetters are referred to as "lower fetters" (orambhāgiyāni saṃyojanāni) and are eradicated upon becoming a non-returner; and, the last five fetters are referred to as "higher fetters" (uddhambhāgiyāni saṃyojanāni), eradicated by an arahant.

=== Three fetters ===
Both the Saṅgīti Sutta (DN 33) and the Dhammasaṅgaṇi (Dhs. 1002-1006) refer to the "three fetters" as the first three in the aforementioned Sutta Pitaka list of ten:

1. belief in a self (sakkāya-diṭṭhi)
2. doubt (vicikicchā)
3. attachment to rites and rituals (sīlabbata-parāmāsa)

According to the Canon, these three fetters are eradicated by stream-enterers and once-returners.

=== Abhidhamma Pitaka's list of ten fetters ===
The Abhidhamma Pitaka's Dhamma Sangani (Dhs. 1113-34) provides an alternate list of ten fetters, also found in the Khuddaka Nikaya's Culla Niddesa (Nd2 656, 1463) and in post-canonical commentaries. This enumeration is:

1. sensual lust (Pali: kāma-rāga)
2. anger (paṭigha)
3. conceit (māna)
4. views (diṭṭhi)
5. doubt (vicikicchā)
6. attachment to rites and rituals (sīlabbata-parāmāsa)
7. lust for existence (bhava-rāga)
8. jealousy (issā)
9. greed (macchariya)
10. ignorance (avijjā).

The commentary mentions that views, doubt, attachment to rites and rituals, jealousy and greed are thrown off at the first stage of Awakening (sotāpatti); gross sensual lust and anger by the second stage (sakadāgāmitā) and even subtle forms of the same by the third stage (anāgāmitā); and conceit, lust for existence and ignorance by the fourth and final stage (arahatta).

=== Fetters related to householder affairs ===
Uniquely, the Sutta Pitaka's "Householder Potaliya" Sutta (MN 54), identifies eight fetters (including three of the Five Precepts) whose abandonment "lead[s] to the cutting off of affairs" (vohāra-samucchedāya saṃvattanti):

1. destroying life (pāṇātipāto)
2. stealing (adinnādānaṃ)
3. false speech (musāvādo)
4. slandering (pisunā)
5. coveting and greed (giddhilobho)
6. aversion (nindāroso)
7. anger and malice (kodhūpāyāso)
8. conceit (atimāno)

== Individual fetters ==
The following fetters are the first three mentioned in the Sutta Pitaka's list of ten fetters, as well as the Saṅgīti Sutta and Abhidhamma Pitaka's list of "three fetters" (DN 33, Dhs. 1002 ff.). As indicated below, eradication of these three fetters is a canonical indicator of one's being irreversibly established on the path to Enlightenment.

=== Identity view (sakkāya-diṭṭhi) ===
Etymologically, kāya means "body," sakkāya means "existing body," and diṭṭhi means "view" (here implying a wrong view, as exemplified by the views in the table below).

In general, "belief in an individual self" or, more simply, "self view" refers to a "belief that in one or other of the khandhas there is a permanent entity, an attā."

Similarly, in MN 2, the Sabbasava Sutta, the Buddha describes "a fetter of views" in the following manner:

Views of the six heretical teachers
- The views of six śramaṇa in the Pāli Canon, known as the six heretical teachers, based on the Sāmaññaphala Sutta.

Pūraṇa Kassapa
- Amoralism (akiriyavāda; natthikavāda): There is no reward or punishment for either good or bad deeds.

Makkhali Gośāla (Ājīvika)
- Fatalism (ahetukavāda; niyativāda): We are powerless; suffering is pre-destined.

Ajita Kesakambalī (Charvaka)
- Materialism (ucchedavāda; natthikavāda): Live happily; with death, all is annihilated.

Pakudha Kaccāyana
- Eternalism and categoricalism (sassatavāda; sattakāyavāda): Matter, pleasure, pain and the soul are eternal and do not interact.

Nigaṇṭha Ñāṭaputta (Jainism)
- Restraint (mahāvrata): Be endowed with, cleansed by, and suffused with [merely] the avoidance of all evil.

Sañjaya Belaṭṭhiputta (Ajñana)
- Agnosticism (amarāvikkhepavāda): "I don't think so. I don't think in that way or otherwise. I don't think not or not not." Suspension of judgement.

"This is how [a person of wrong view] attends inappropriately: 'Was I in the past? ... Shall I be in the future? ... Am I? Am I not? What am I? ...'

"As one attends inappropriately in this way, one of six kinds of view arises: ...
- 'I have a self...'
- 'I have no self...'
- 'It is precisely by means of self that I perceive self...'
- 'It is precisely by means of self that I perceive not-self...'
- 'It is precisely by means of not-self that I perceive self...'
- 'This very self of mine ... is the self of mine that is constant...'
"This is called a thicket of views, a wilderness of views, a contortion of views, a writhing of views, a fetter of views. Bound by a fetter of views, the uninstructed ... is not freed, I tell you, from suffering & stress."

=== Doubt (vicikicchā) ===
In general, "doubt" (vicikicchā) refers to doubt about the Buddha's teachings, the Dhamma. (Alternate contemporaneous teachings are represented in the adjacent table.)

More specifically, in SN 22.84, the Tissa Sutta, the Buddha explicitly cautions against uncertainty regarding the Noble Eightfold Path, which is described as the right path to Nibbana, leading one past ignorance, sensual desire, anger and despair.

=== Attachment to rites and rituals (sīlabbata-parāmāso) ===
Śīla refers to "moral conduct", vata (or bata) to "religious duty, observance, rite, practice, custom," and parāmāsa to "being attached to" or "a contagion" and has the connotation of "mishandling" the Dhamma. Altogether, sīlabbata-parāmāso has been translated as "the contagion of mere rule and ritual, the infatuation of good works, the delusion that they suffice" or, more simply, "fall[ing] back on attachment to precepts and rules."

While the fetter of doubt can be seen as pertaining to the teachings of competing samana during the times of the Buddha, this fetter regarding rites and rituals likely refers to some practices of contemporary brahmanic authorities.

== Cutting through the fetters ==
Meditation
with the fetters

"Here, O bhikkhus, a bhikkhu understands the eye and material forms and the fetter that arises dependent on both (eye and forms); he understands how the arising of the non-arisen fetter comes to be; he understands how the abandoning of the arisen fetter comes to be; and he understands how the non-arising in the future of the abandoned fetter comes to be. [And thus] he understands the ear and sounds .... the organ of smell and odors .... the organ of taste and flavors .... the organ of touch and tactual objects .... [and] consciousness and mental objects ...."

— Satipatthana Sutta (MN 10)

In MN 64, the "Greater Discourse to Mālunkyāputta," the Buddha states that the path to abandoning the five lower fetters (that is, the first five of the aforementioned "ten fetters") is through using jhana attainment and vipassana insights in tandem. In SN 35.54, "Abandoning the Fetters," the Buddha states that one abandons the fetters "when one knows and sees ... as impermanent" (Pali: anicca) the twelve sense bases (āyatana), the associated six sense-consciousness (viññaṇa), and the resultant contact (phassa) and sensations (vedanā). Similarly, in SN 35.55, "Uprooting the Fetters," the Buddha states that one uproots the fetters "when one knows and sees ... as nonself" (anatta) the sense bases, sense consciousness, contact and sensations.

The Pali canon traditionally describes cutting through the fetters in four stages:

- one cuts the first three fetters (Pali: tīṇi saŋyojanāni) to be a "stream enterer" (sotapanna);
- one cuts the first three fetters and significantly weakens the next two fetters to be a "once returner" (sakadagami);
- one cuts the first five fetters (orambhāgiyāni samyojanāni) to be a "non-returner" (anagami);
- one cuts all ten fetters to be an arahant.

== Relationship to other core concepts ==
Similar Buddhist concepts found throughout the Pali Canon include the five hindrances (nīvaraṇāni) and the ten defilements (kilesā). Comparatively speaking, in the Theravada tradition, fetters span multiple lifetimes and are difficult to remove, while hindrances are transitory obstacles. Defilements encompass all mental defilements including both fetters and hindrances.

== See also ==
- Anatta, regarding the first fetter (sakkāya-diṭṭhi)
- Four stages of enlightenment, regarding cutting the fetters
- Five hindrances, also involving the fourth (kamacchanda), fifth (vyapada), ninth (uddhacca) and second (vicikiccha) fetters
- Upadana (Clinging), where the traditional four types of clinging are clinging to sense-pleasure (kamupadana), wrong views (ditthupadana), rites and rituals (silabbatupadana) and self-doctrine (attavadupadana)

== Bibliography ==
- Bodhi, Bhikkhu (2000). The Connected Discourses of the Buddha: A Translation of the Samyutta Nikaya. Somerville, MA: Wisdom Publications. ISBN 0-86171-331-1.
- Bodhi, Bhikkhu (18 Jan 2005). MN 10: Satipatthana Sutta (continued) [Ninth dharma talk on the Satipatthana Sutta (MP3 audio file)]. Available on-line at http://www.bodhimonastery.net/MP3/M0060_MN-010.mp3.
- Gethin, Rupert (1998). The Foundations of Buddhism. Oxford: Oxford University Press. ISBN 0-19-289223-1.
- Gunaratana, Henepola (2003). Satipatthana Sutta [Dharma talks (MP3 on CD)]. High View, WV: Bhavana Society. Orderable on-line at https://web.archive.org/web/20070205193623/http://www.bhavanasociety.org/resource/satipatthana_sutta_cd/.
- Harvey, Peter (1990/2007). An Introduction to Buddhism: Teachings, History and Practices. Cambridge: Cambridge University Press. ISBN 0-521-31333-3.
- Ñāṇamoli, Bhikkhu & Bhikkhu Bodhi (2001). The Middle Length Discourse of the Buddha: A Translation of the Majjhima Nikāya. Somerville, MA: Wisdom Publications. ISBN 0-86171-072-X.
- Nyanaponika Thera (trans.) (1974). Alagaddupama Sutta: The Snake Simile (MN 22). Kandy: Buddhist Publication Society. Retrieved 15 Aug. 2010 from "Access to Insight" (2006) at https://www.accesstoinsight.org/tipitaka/mn/mn.022.nypo.html .
- Rhys Davids, C.A.F. ([1900], 2003). Buddhist Manual of Psychological Ethics, of the Fourth Century B.C., Being a Translation, now made for the First Time, from the Original Pāli, of the First Book of the Abhidhamma-Piṭaka, entitled Dhamma-Sangaṇi (Compendium of States or Phenomena). Kessinger Publishing. ISBN 0-7661-4702-9.
- Rhys Davids, T.W. & William Stede (eds.) (1921-5). The Pali Text Society's Pali–English dictionary. Chipstead: Pali Text Society. A general on-line search engine for the PED is available at https://dsal.uchicago.edu/dictionaries/pali/.
- Soma Thera (1998) (6th rev. ed.). The Way of Mindfulness: The Satipatthana Sutta and Its Commentary. Available on-line at http://www.accesstoinsight.org/lib/authors/soma/wayof.html.
- Sri Lanka Buddha Jayanti Tipitaka Series [SLTP] (undated). Potaliya suttaṃ [in Pali] (MN 54). Available on-line at http://www.metta.lk/tipitaka/2Sutta-Pitaka/2Majjhima-Nikaya/Majjhima2/054-potaliya-p.html.
- Thanissaro Bhikkhu (trans.) (1997a). Sabbasava Sutta: All the Fermentations (MN 2). Available on-line at https://www.accesstoinsight.org/tipitaka/mn/mn.002.than.html.
- Thanissaro Bhikkhu (trans.) (1997). Samaññaphala Sutta: The Fruits of the Contemplative Life (DN 2). Available on-line at https://www.accesstoinsight.org/tipitaka/dn/dn.02.0.than.html.
- Thanissaro, Bhikkhu (trans.) (1997b). Sona Sutta: About Sona (AN 6.55). Available on-line at https://www.accesstoinsight.org/tipitaka/an/an06/an06.055.than.html.
- Thanissaro Bhikkhu (trans.) (2000). Sanyojana Sutta: Fetters (AN 10.13). https://www.accesstoinsight.org/tipitaka/an/an10/an10.013.than.html.
- Thanissaro Bhikkhu (trans.) (2001). The Group of Ones § 15 (Iti. 1.15). Available on-line at https://www.accesstoinsight.org/tipitaka/kn/iti/iti.1.001-027.than.html#iti-015.
- Thanissaro Bhikkhu (trans.) (2005). Tissa Sutta: Tissa (SN 22.84). Available on-line at https://www.accesstoinsight.org/tipitaka/sn/sn22/sn22.084.than.html.
- Upalavanna, Sister (trans.) (undated). To The Householder Potaliya (MN 54). Available on-line at https://web.archive.org/web/20101102225156/http://metta.lk/tipitaka/2Sutta-Pitaka/2Majjhima-Nikaya/Majjhima2/054-potaliya-e1.html.
- Walshe, Maurice O'Connell (trans.) (1995). The Long Discourses of the Buddha: A Translation of the Dīgha Nikāya. Somerville: Wisdom Publications. ISBN 0-86171-103-3.
