= Middha =

Sanskrit term

Translations of Middha
- English: torpor sleep drowsiness
- Sanskrit: मिद्ध (middha)
- Pali: middha
- Burmese: မိဒ္ဓ
- Chinese: 睡眠 (T) / 睡眠 (S) 眠 (T) / 眠 (S)
- Indonesian: kantuk; kelambanan
- Khmer: មិទ្ឋៈ (UNGEGN: mettheak)
- Korean: 수면, 면 (RR: sumyeon, myeon)
- Tibetan: གཉིད། (Wylie: gnyid; THL: nyi)
- Vietnamese: Thụy miên

Middha (Sanskrit: मिद्ध; Pali: मिद्ध; Tibetan phonetic: nyi) is a Buddhist term that is translated as "torpor", "drowsiness", "sleep", etc. In the Theravada tradition, middha is defined as a morbid state that is characterized by unwieldiness, lack of energy, and opposition to wholesome activity. In the Mahayana tradition, middha is defined as a mental factor that causes the mind to draw inward, lose discrimination between wholesome and unwholesome activities, and drop out of activities altogether.

Middha is identified as:

- One of the fourteen unwholesome mental factors within the Theravada Abhidharma teachings
- One of the four changeable mental factors within the Mahayana Abhidharma teachings
- One of the five hindrances to meditation (in combination with thīna)

== Explanations ==
=== Theravada ===
Bhikkhu Bodhi explains:

Torpor is the morbid state of the mental factors. Its characteristic is unwieldiness. Its function is to smother. It is manifested as drooping, or as nodding and sleepiness. Its proximate cause is the same as that of sloth (thina).

The Atthasālinī (II, Book I, Part IX, Chapter II, 255) states about sloth and torpor: “Absence of striving, difficulty through inability, is the meaning.” We then read the following definitions of sloth and torpor:

The compound “sloth-torpor” is sloth plus torpor; of which sloth has absence of, or opposition to striving as characteristic, destruction of energy as function, sinking of associated states as manifestation; torpor has unwieldiness as characteristic, closing the doors of consciousness as function, shrinking in taking the object, or drowsiness as manifestation; and both have unsystematic thought, in not arousing oneself from discontent and laziness (or indulgence), as proximate cause.

Nina van Gorkom explains:

When there are sloth and torpor there is no energy, no vigour to perform dāna, to observe sīla, to listen to Dhamma, to study the Dhamma or to develop calm, no energy to be mindful of the reality which appears now.

=== Mahayana ===
The Abhidharma-samuccaya states:

What is drowsiness (middha)? By making the cause of drowsiness its point of departure, the mind is agreeable to the positive, negative, indifferent, timely, untimely, appropriate, and inappropriate. Drowsiness is related to bewilderment erring. Its function is to become the basis of slipping away from what must be done.

Mipham Rinpoche states:

[Middha] causes the consciousness of the five sense doors to be withdrawn inwardly without any discrimination as to what is virtuous or unvirtuous, appropriate or inappropriate, or timely or untimely. It belongs to the category of delusion and forms the support for losing activities.

Alexander Berzin explains:

Sleep (middha; Tibetan: gnyid) is a part of naivety (moha). Sleep is a withdrawal from sensory cognition, characterized by a physical feeling of heaviness, weakness, tiredness, and mental darkness. It causes us to drop our activities.

== Alternate translations ==
- Drowsiness (Herbert Guenther)
- Sleep (Erik Pema Kunsang, Alexander Berzin)
- Torpor (Bhikkhu Bodhi, Nina van Gorkom)

== See also ==
- Mental factors (Buddhism)
- Moha (Buddhism)

== Sources ==
- Berzin, Alexander (2006), Primary Minds and the 51 Mental Factors
- Bhikkhu Bodhi (2003), A Comprehensive Manual of Abhidhamma, Pariyatti Publishing
- Guenther, Herbert V. & Leslie S. Kawamura (1975), Mind in Buddhist Psychology: A Translation of Ye-shes rgyal-mtshan's "The Necklace of Clear Understanding" Dharma Publishing. Kindle Edition.
- Kunsang, Erik Pema (translator) (2004). Gateway to Knowledge, Vol. 1. North Atlantic Books.
- Nina van Gorkom (2010), Cetasikas, Zolag
