= Sakadagami =

Buddhist stage of enlightenment

In Buddhism, the Sakadāgāmin (Pali; Sanskrit: Sakṛdāgāmin, Chinese: 斯陀含 or 一往來; pinyin: sī tuó hán), "returning once" or "once-returner," is a partially enlightened person, who has cut off the first three chains with which the ordinary mind is bound, and significantly weakened the fourth and fifth. Sakadagaminship is the second stage of the four stages of enlightenment.

The Sakadagami will be reborn into the realm of the senses at most once more. If, however, they attain the next stage of enlightenment (Anagamiship) in this life, they will not come back to this world.

The four stages of awakening according to the Sutta Piṭaka.
Outcome	Further rebirths	Abandoned fetters	
stream-enterer (sotāpanna)	up to seven, in earthly or heavenly realms	1. identity view 2. doubt in Buddha; 3. ascetic or ritual rules	lower fetters
once-returner (sakadagami)	one more, as a human	1. identity view 2. doubt in Buddha; 3. ascetic or ritual rules	lower fetters
non-returner (anāgāmi)	one more, in a pure abode	4. sensual desire 5. ill will	lower fetters
arahant	none	6. desire for material rebirth 7. desire for immaterial rebirth 8. conceit 9. restlessness 10. ignorance	higher fetters

The three specific chains or fetters (Pali: saṃyojana) of which the Sakadagamin is free are:
1. Sakkāya-diṭṭhi (Pali) - Belief in self (ātman)
2. Sīlabbata-parāmāsa (Pali) - Attachment to rites and rituals
3. Vicikicchā (Pali) - Skeptical doubt
The Sakadagami also significantly weakened the chains of:
4. Kāma-rāga (Pali) - Sensuous craving
5. Vyāpāda (Pali) - Ill-will

Thus, the Sakadagamin is an intermediate stage between the Sotapanna, who still has comparatively strong sensuous desire and ill-will, and the Anagami, who is completely free from sensuous desire and ill-will. A Sakadagami's mind is very pure. Thoughts connected with greed, hatred, and delusion do not arise often, and when they do, do not become obsessive.

== See also ==
- Four stages of enlightenment
- Fetters (Buddhism)

== Sources ==
- Rhys Davids, T.W. & William Stede (eds.) (1921-5). The Pali Text Society’s Pali–English Dictionary. Chipstead: Pali Text Society. A general on-line search engine for the PED is available at http://dsal.uchicago.edu/dictionaries/pali/.
