= Kleshas (Hinduism) =

Spiritual afflictions in Hinduism

Klesha (Sanskrit: क्लेश, IAST: Kleśa) is a Sanskrit word meaning "impurity", "corruption" or "poison". In Hinduism, a klesha is a mental state, such as fear or ignorance, that clouds the mind and leads to unhealthy actions. It is an obstacle to reaching a state of enlightenment and liberation (moksha) from saṃsāra.

== Five kleshas ==
The third śloka of the second chapter of Patañjali's Yoga Sūtras explicitly identifies the five poisons (pañcakleśa):

अविद्यास्मितारागद्वेषाभिनिवेशाः पञ्च क्लेशाः॥३॥
Avidyāsmitārāgadveṣābhiniveśāḥ pañca kleśāḥ

Translated into English, these five kleshas are:

- Ignorance (ávidyā), the first cause of suffering. It obscures the higher self by firmly establishing negative habits and resisting change
- Ego (asmitā), attachment to the ego.
- Attachment (rāga), desire for material objects, relationships, status, power, or other desires
- Aversion (dveṣa) or anger towards unpleasant things, people, and experiences
- Clinging to life (abhiniveśa), fear of death and desire to live.

According to the Yoga Sutras, there are four stages for overcoming the effects of the kleshas: the active stage (udaram), the detached stage (vicchinna), the decaying stage (tanu) and the dormant stage (parsupta).

== Literature ==
The Yoga Sutras of Patanjali describe suffering as an impediment to spiritual growth. Yogic practices such as meditation and pranayama breathing exercises provide methods to overcome afflictions. According to Shiva Purana 2.3.5 and Hathatatvakaumudi, klesha refers to suffering (i.e. suffering caused by penance).

== See also ==
- Lobha – Hindu and Buddhist concept of character affliction
- Maya – Concept in Indian religions
