= Māna =

Buddhist term that may be translated as "pride", "arrogance", or "conceit"

Translations of māna
- English: pride, arrogance conceit
- Sanskrit: māna
- Burmese: မာန (MLCTS: màna̰)
- Chinese: 虛榮 (T) / 虛榮 (S)
- Indonesian: kesombongan
- Japanese: 慢 (Rōmaji: Man)
- Korean: 만 (RR: man)
- Mon: မာန် ([màn])
- Shan: မႃႇၼႃႉ ([maa2 naa5])
- Tibetan: ང་རྒྱལ་ (Wylie: nga rgyal; THL: ngagyal)
- Thai: มานะ
- Vietnamese: Mạn

Māna (Sanskrit, Pali; Tibetan: nga rgyal) is a Buddhist term that may be translated as "pride", "arrogance", or "conceit". It is defined as an inflated mind that makes whatever is suitable, such as wealth or learning, to be the foundation of pride. It creates the basis for disrespecting others and for the occurrence of suffering.

Māna is identified as:

- One of the five poisons within the Mahayana Buddhist tradition.
- One of the six root unwholesome mental factors within the Mahayana Abhidharma teachings
- One of the fourteen unwholesome mental factors within the Theravada Abhidhamma teachings
- One of the ten fetters in the Theravada tradition

== Explanations ==
=== Theravada ===
Nina van Gorkom explains:

There is conceit or pride when we consider ourselves important. Because of conceit we may compare ourselves with others. There can be conceit when we think ourselves better, equal or less than someone else. We may believe that there can be conceit only when we think ourselves better than someone else, but this is not so. There can be a kind of upholding of ourselves, of making ourselves important, while we compare ourselves with someone else, no matter in what way, and that is conceit.

The Atthasālinī (II, Part IX, Chapter III, 256) gives the following definition of conceit:

...Herein conceit is fancying (deeming, vain imagining). It has haughtiness as characteristic, self-praise as function, desire to (advertise self like) a banner as manifestation, greed dissociated from opinionatedness as proximate cause, and should be regarded as (a form of) lunacy.

=== Mahayana ===
The Abhidharma-samuccaya states:

What is arrogance? It is an inflated mind as to what is perishable and its function is to serve as the basis for disrespect and frustrations.

Herbert Guenther explains:

Arrogance is a mental event which is a kind of inflated mind making whatever is suitable, such as wealth or learning, to be the foundation of pride.

Alexander Berzin explains:

Arrogance (nga-rgyal, pride) is a puffed-up mind (khengs-pa) based on a deluded outlook toward a transitory network (‘jig-lta). [...] It functions to make us not appreciate others or respect the good qualities of others (mi-gus-pa) and to prevent us from learning anything.

The Mahayana tradition identifies seven types of arrogance:

- Arrogance (nga-rgyal) is a puffed-up mind that feels one is better than someone who has inferior qualities.
- Exaggerated arrogance (lhag-pa’i nga-rgyal) is a puffed-up mind that feels one is better than one's peers (someone equal to oneself in some quality).
- Outrageous arrogance (nga-rgyal-las-kyang nga-rgyal) is a puffed-up mind that feels one is better than someone superior to oneself in some quality.
- Egotistic arrogance (nga’o snyam-pa’i nga-rgyal) is a puffed-up mind that thinks “me” while focusing on our own samsara-perpetuating aggregates (nyer-len-gyi phung-po).
- False or anticipatory arrogance or arrogance of showing off (mngon-par nga-rgyal) is a puffed-up mind that feels I have attained some quality that I have not actually attained or not yet attained; or thinking one has achievements when one has achieved nothing.
- Modest arrogance or arrogance of thinking small (cung-zad snyam-pa’i nga-rgyal) is a puffed-up mind that feels that I am just a little bit inferior compared to someone vastly superior to myself in some quality, but still superior to almost everyone else.
- Distorted arrogance or perverted arrogance (log-pa’i nga-rgyal) is a puffed-up mind that feels that some deviant aspect that I have fallen to (khol-sar shor-ba) is a good quality that I have attained—for instance, being a good hunter.

== See also ==
- Karma in Buddhism
- Kleshas (Buddhism)
- Mental factors (Buddhism)

== Sources ==
- Berzin, Alexander (2006), Primary Minds and the 51 Mental Factors
- Goleman, Daniel (2008). Destructive Emotions: A Scientific Dialogue with the Dalai Lama. Bantam. Kindle Edition.
- Guenther, Herbert V. & Leslie S. Kawamura (1975), Mind in Buddhist Psychology: A Translation of Ye-shes rgyal-mtshan's "The Necklace of Clear Understanding" Dharma Publishing. Kindle Edition.
- Kunsang, Erik Pema (translator) (2004). Gateway to Knowledge, Vol. 1. North Atlantic Books.
- Nina van Gorkom (2010), Cetasikas, Zolag
- Ranjung Yeshe Wiki - Dharma Dictionary. http://rywiki.tsadra.org/index.php/nga_rgyal
