= View (Buddhism) =

Buddhist term

Translations of View
- English: view, position
- Sanskrit: dṛṣṭi (दृष्टि)
- Pali: diṭṭhi (दिट्ठी)
- Bengali: দৃষ্টি (Drishti)
- Burmese: ဒိဋ္ဌိ (အယူ)
- Chinese: 見
- Indonesian: pandangan, pengertian
- Japanese: 見 (Rōmaji: ken)
- Khmer: ទិដ្ឋិ (UNGEGN: tetthek)
- Tagalog: pananaw
- Vietnamese: Kiến

View or position (Pali diṭṭhi, Sanskrit dṛṣṭi) is a central idea in Buddhism. In Buddhist thought, a "view" is not a simple, abstract collection of propositions, but a charged interpretation of experience which intensely shapes and affects thought, sensation, and action.

Having the proper mental attitude toward views is therefore considered an integral part of the Buddhist path, as sometimes correct views need to be put into practice and incorrect views abandoned, and sometimes all views are seen as obstacles to enlightenment, which ultimately must be understood in a non-conceptual manner.

== Overview ==
The term dṛṣṭi (Pāli: diṭṭhi; Tibetan: lta ba; Chinese: 見, jian) is often translated as "view" or "opinion." In Buddhism, the basic distinction is between "right view" (Sanskrit: samyak-dṛṣṭi) and "wrong views" (S. mithyādṛṣṭi). Furthermore, even right views are seen as something that should not be clung to. In the Atthakavagga, the Buddha strongly critiques the dangers of holding rigid views or grasping at views, even right ones, which can become sources of attachment that lead to arrogance, disputes, and division.

Views produce mental conditioning, which produce further views or clinging to views. As such, views are symptoms of conditioning, rather than neutral alternatives individuals can dispassionately choose. The Buddha, in the early discourses, often refers to the negative effect of attachment to speculative or fixed views, dogmatic opinions, or even correct views if not known to be true by personal verification. In describing the highly diverse intellectual landscape of his day, he is said to have referred to "the wrangling of views, the jungle of views". Those who wish to experience nirvana must free themselves from everything binding them to the world, including attachment to philosophical and religious doctrines.

In the early sutras, the Buddha, having attained the state of unconditioned mind, is said to have "passed beyond the bondage, tie, greed, obsession, acceptance, attachment, and lust of view." This indicates that the ultimate goal of abandoning wrong views in favor of right view is peaceful non-attachment. In other words, right view is not an end in itself, but just one useful element of the path to nirvana. As such, right view, the first part of the Noble Eightfold Path, culminates in a total letting go, as well as in a non-conceptual realization of the truth which is beyond all views.

== Wrong views ==
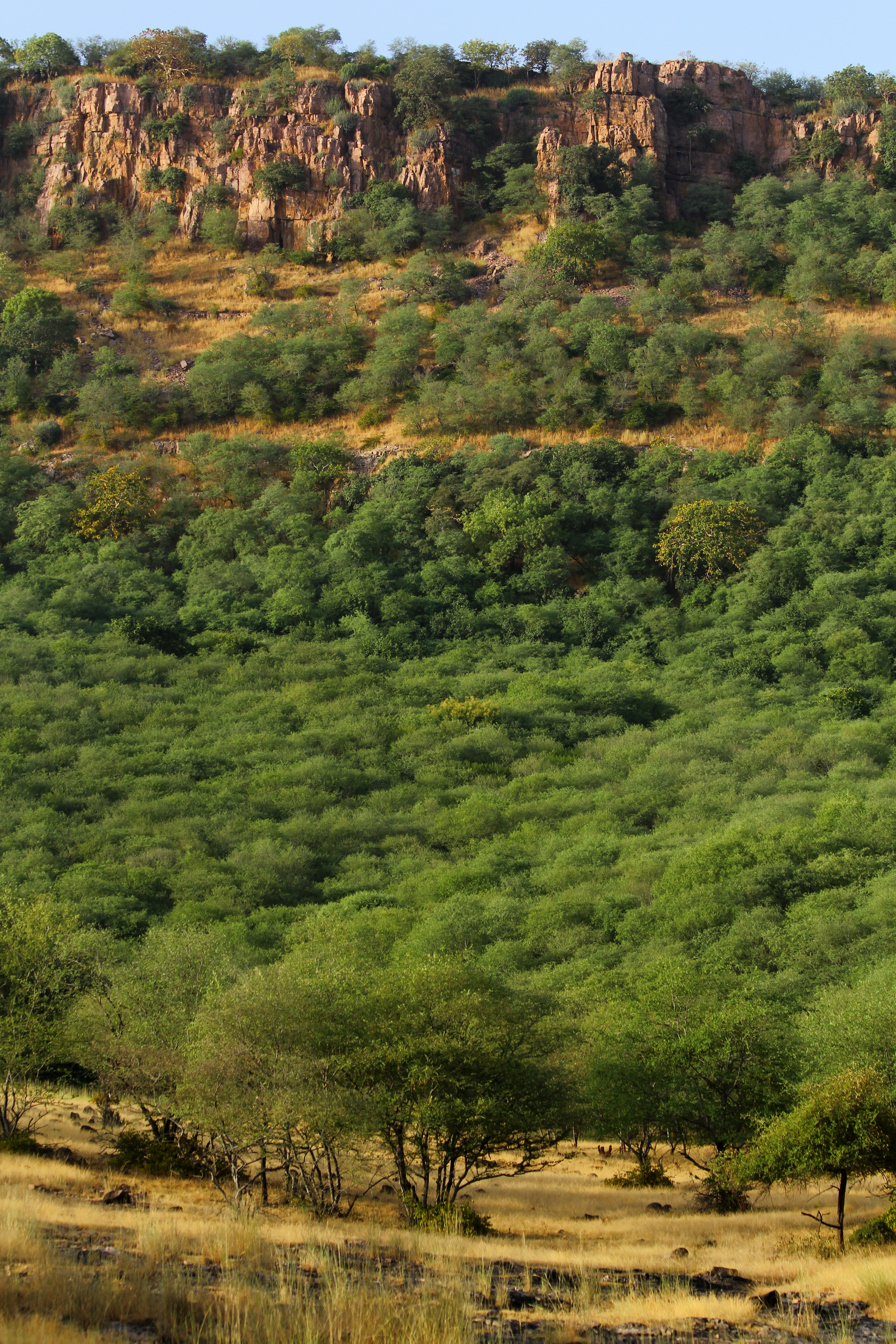
In describing the highly diverse intellectual landscape of his day, the Buddha is said to have referred to "the wrangling of views, the jungle of views".

A central element of Buddhist teachings is identifying wrong views and abandoning them in favor of right view. Buddhist texts frequently include a standardized list of five types of wrong views (pañca-dṛṣṭi):

1. The belief in the existence of a permanent self or soul (satkāyadṛṣṭi).
2. Extreme views (antagrāhadṛṣṭi), such as eternalism (dhruva), the idea that there's an eternal part of ourselves that lasts forever, or annihilationism (uccheda), the idea that at death, everything is destroyed and there is no continuity.
3. False views (mithyādṛṣṭi), including denial of karma, rebirth, or causality.
4. The rigid clinging to speculative views (dṛṣṭiparāmarśa), believing one’s own views to be inherently superior.
5. śīlavrataparāmarśa - attachment to the salvific power of ethical actions (śīla) and vows (vrata), believing that liberation arises through following moral discipline or taking special ascetic vows.

Beyond these, many other wrong views are enumerated in Buddhist texts.

The concept of views also plays a role in other doctrinal frameworks: it is listed as the second of the four attachments (upādāna), alongside sensual desire (kāma), faith in the efficacy of rites and rituals (śīlavrata), and belief in a permanent self (ātmavāda). Furthermore, views are identified as the third of the four mental poisons (āsrava), along with sensuality (kāma), craving for continued existence (bhava), and ignorance (avidyā).

== Right view ==
=== Understanding karma ===
The term "right view" (Sanskrit: samyak-dṛṣṭi, Pali: sammā-diṭṭhi) or "right understanding" is basically about having a correct attitude towards one's social and religious duties. This is explained from the perspective of the system of karma and the cycle of rebirth. Used in an ethical context, it entails that our actions have consequences, that death is not the end, that our actions and beliefs also have consequences after death, and that the Buddha followed and taught a successful path out of this world and the other world (heaven and underworld or hell).

Originating in the pre-Buddhist Brahmanical concerns with sacrifice rituals and asceticism, in early texts the Buddha shifts the emphasis to a karmic perspective, which includes the entire religious life. The Buddha further describes such right view as beneficial, because whether these views are true or not, people acting on them (i.e. leading a good life) will be praised by the wise. They will also act in a correct way. If the views do turn out to be true, and there is a next world after death, such people will experience the good karma of what they have done when they were still alive. This is not to say that the Buddha is described as uncertain about right view: he, as well as other accomplished spiritual masters, are depicted as having "seen" these views by themselves as reality. Although devotees may not be able to see these truths for themselves yet, they are expected to develop a "pro-attitude" towards them. Moral right view is not just considered to be adopted, however. Rather, the practitioner endeavors to live following right view, such practice will reflect on the practitioner, and will eventually lead to deeper insight into and wisdom about reality.

According to Indologist Tilmann Vetter, right view came to explicitly include karma and Rebirth, and the importance of the Four Noble Truths, when "insight" became central to Buddhist soteriology. This presentation of right view still plays an essential role in Theravada Buddhism.

=== Understanding doctrine ===
A second meaning of right view is an initial understanding of points of doctrine such as the Four Noble Truths, not-self and Dependent Origination, combined with the intention to accept those teachings and apply them to oneself. Thirdly, a "supramundane" right view is also distinguished, which refers to a more refined, intuitive understanding produced by meditative practice. Thus, a gradual path of self-development is described, in which the meaning of right view gradually develops. In the beginning, right view can only lead to a good rebirth, but at the highest level, right view can help the practitioner to attain to liberation from the cycle of existence.

Buddhist Studies scholar Paul Fuller believes that although there are differences between the different levels of right view, all levels aim for emotional detachment. The wisdom of right view at the moral level leads to see the world without greed, hatred and delusion.

Misunderstanding objects as self is not only seen as a form of wrong view, but also as a manifestation of desire, requiring a change in character.

== Nyingma Dzogchen ==
The Nyingma Mantrayana of the Vajrayana Buddhadharma has a doxographic and pedagogic skillful model of Nine Yana, each of which has a defining or characteristic paradigm. Each of these nine yana is understood as a historical category of literature set in time, place and circumstance as well as an exegetical framework for discussing and contemplating these works. This Nine Yana modality also allows for the discrete explication of distinct experiential sadhana lineages in its own right; inclusivity to one of the nine yana is according to a large group of similarities and congruences of the conduct and 'view' (Tibetan Wylie: lta ba; pronounced: tawa) to be cultivated therein.

== See also ==
- Attachment to views (diṭṭhigata upādāna)
- Identity view (sakkāya-diṭṭhi, a fetter of the mind on the Buddhist path)
- Sammādiṭṭhi Sutta (Early Discourse on right view)
- Kālāma Sutta (Early Discourse about misguided beliefs)
- The Blind Men and the Elephant (metaphor on fighting about opinions)
- Dogma
