= Pure abodes =

Buddhist philosophical concept

The Śuddhāvāsa (Sanskrit: शुद्धावास; Pali: सुद्धावास, romanized: suddhāvāsa; Tibetan: གནས་གཙང་མ་, Wylie: gnas gtsang ma; Vietnamese: Tịnh Cư Thiên; Chinese: 五部淨居天／五部净居天; Japanese: 五部浄居天, romanized: gobujōgoten; Korean: 정거천, romanized: jeonggeocheon; Thai: สุทฺธาวาส) worlds or "Pure Abodes" are distinct from the other worlds of the rūpadhātu in that they do not house beings who have been born there through ordinary merit or meditative attainments, but only those Anāgāmins ("Non-returners") who are already on the path to Arhat-hood and who will attain enlightenment directly from the Śuddhāvāsa worlds without being reborn in a lower plane. Every Śuddhāvāsa deva is therefore a protector of Buddhism. (Brahma Sahampati, who appealed to the newly enlightened Buddha to teach, was an Anagami from a previous Buddha). Because a Śuddhāvāsa deva will never be reborn outside the Śuddhāvāsa worlds, no Bodhisattva is ever born in these worlds, as a Bodhisattva must ultimately be reborn as a human being.

Since these devas rise from lower planes only due to the teaching of a Buddha, they can remain empty for very long periods if no Buddha arises. However, unlike the lower worlds, the Śuddhāvāsa worlds are never destroyed by natural catastrophe. The Śuddhāvāsa devas predict the coming of a Buddha and, taking the guise of Brahmins, reveal to human beings the signs by which a Buddha can be recognized. They also ensure that a Bodhisattva in his last life will see the four signs that will lead to his renunciation.

== Five Pure Abodes ==
The Princeton Dictionary of Buddhism states that "The heavens of the realm of subtle materiality (rūpadhātu) consist of sixteen (according to the Sarvāstivāda school), seventeen (the Sautrantika school), or eighteen levels (the Theravada/Sthavirankāya school) of devas ... The last five heavens are collectively designated as the five pure abodes, and the divinities residing there are called the Śuddhāvāsakāyika devas."

The five Śuddhāvāsa worlds are:

- Akaniṣṭha or Akaniṭṭha (Sanskrit; Pali; Tibetan: འོག་མིན, Wylie: ’og min) – World of devas "equal in rank" (literally: having no one as the youngest). The highest of all the Rūpadhātu worlds, it is often used to refer to the highest extreme of the universe. The current Śakra will eventually be born there. The duration of life in Akaniṣṭha is 16,000 kalpas (Vibhajyavāda tradition). The ruler of Akaniṣṭha is Maheśvara. The height of this world is 167,772,160 yojanas above the Earth (approximately the distance of Saturn from Earth).
- Sudarśana or Sudassī (Tibetan: ཤིན་ཏུ་མཐོང, Wylie: shin tu mthong) – The "clear-seeing" devas live in a world similar to and friendly with the Akaniṣṭha world. The height of this world is 83,886,080 yojanas above the Earth (approximately the distance of Jupiter from Earth).
- Sudṛśa or Sudassa (Tibetan: གྱ་ནོམ་སྣང་བ, Wylie: gya nom snang ba) – The world of the "beautiful" devas are said to be the place of rebirth for five kinds of anāgāmins. The height of this world is 41,943,040 yojanas above the Earth.
- Atapa or Atappa (Tibetan: མི་གདུང་བ, Wylie: mi gdung ba) – The world of the "untroubled" devas, whose company those of lower realms wish for. The height of this world is 20,971,520 yojanas above the Earth (approximately the distance of Sun from Earth).
- Avṛha or Aviha (Tibetan: མི་ཆེ་བ, Wylie: mi che ba) – The world of the "not falling" devas, perhaps the most common destination for reborn Anāgāmins. Many achieve arhatship directly in this world, but some pass away and are reborn in sequentially higher worlds of the Pure Abodes until they are at last reborn in the Akaniṣṭha world. These are called in Pāli uddhaṃsotas, "those whose stream goes upward". The duration of life in Avṛha is 1,000 kalpas (Vibhajyavāda tradition). The height of this world is 10,485,760 yojanas above the Earth (approximately the distance of Mars from Earth).
