= Vicikitsa =

Doubt in Buddhism as a hindrance

Translations of vicikitsa
- English: doubt indecision skepticism indecisive wavering
- Sanskrit: विचिकित्सा (vicikitsā)
- Pali: vicikicchā
- Chinese: 疑
- Indonesian: keraguan
- Japanese: 疑 (Rōmaji: gi)
- Khmer: វិចិកិច្ឆា (UNGEGN: vichek-kech-chha)
- Tibetan: ཐེ་ཚོམ་ (Wylie: the tshom; THL: tétsom)
- Thai: วิจิกิจฉา (RTGS: wichikitcha)
- Vietnamese: Hoài nghi

Vicikitsa (Sanskrit, also vicikitsā; Pali: vicikicchā; Tibetan Wylie: the tshom) is a Buddhist term that is translated as "doubt" or "indecision". It is defined as being of two minds about the meaning of the Four Noble Truths; it functions as a basis for not becoming involved with unwholesome activities.

Vicikitsa is identified as:

- One of the five hindrances that impede meditation
- One of the six root unwholesome mental factors within the Mahayana Abhidharma teachings
- One of the fourteen unwholesome mental factors within the Theravada Abhidhamma teachings
- One of the ten fetters in the Theravada tradition

== Explanations ==
=== Theravada ===
Nina van Gorkom explains:

The reality of vicikicchā is not the same as what we mean by doubt in conventional language. Vicikicchā is not doubt about someone's name or about the weather. Vicikicchā is doubt about realities, about nāma and rūpa, about cause and result, about the four noble Truths, about the "Dependent Origination".

The Atthasālinī (II, Part IX, Chapter III, 259) defines vicikicchā as follows:

...It has shifting about as characteristic, mental wavering as function, indecision or uncertainty in grasp as manifestation, unsystematic thought (unwise attention) as proximate cause, and it should be regarded as a danger to attainment.

=== Mahayana ===
The Abhidharma-samuccaya states:

What is vicikitsa? It is to be in two minds about the truth, and its function is to serve as a basis for not becoming involved with positive things.

Herbert Guenther explains:

Indecision [vicikitsa] is the mental event in which one oscillates between two extremes concerning the four truths and the relationship between one's action and its result. This indecision creates obstacles for everything positive and in particular for the vision of the truth.

Alexander Berzin explains:

Indecisive wavering (the-tshoms, doubt) is entertaining two minds about what is true – in other words, wavering between accepting or rejecting what is true. What is true refers to such facts as the four noble truths and behavioral cause and effect. Moreover, the wavering may tend more to the side of what is true, more to the side of what is false, or be evenly divided between the two. Indecisive wavering functions as a basis for not engaging with what is constructive.

Chogyam Trungpa states that vicikitsa (doubt) means "you do not trust any possible alternatives and do not want advice or any way out". This includes doubting the teachings, the teacher, and the dharma, as well as the norms of everyday existence.

== See also ==
- Kleshas (Buddhism)
- Mental factors (Buddhism)
- Vīmaṃsaka Sutta

== Sources ==
- Berzin, Alexander (12 November 2021) [2015]. "Primary Minds and the 51 Mental Factors". Archived from the original on 20 April 2024.
- Chögyam Trungpa (2009). The Truth of Suffering and the Path of Liberation. Shambhala.
- Goleman, Daniel (2008). Destructive Emotions: A Scientific Dialogue with the Dalai Lama (Kindle ed.). Bantam.
- Guenther, Herbert V.; Kawamura, Leslie S. (1975). Mind in Buddhist Psychology: A Translation of Ye-shes rgyal-mtshan's 'The Necklace of Clear Understanding' (Kindle ed.). Dharma Publishing.
- Gateway to Knowledge. Vol. 1. Translated by Kunsang, Erik Pema. North Atlantic Books. 2004.
- van Gorkom, Nina (13 August 2010). "Vicikicchā". Cetasikas (2nd ed.). London: Zolag. pp. 149–151.
