= Auddhatya =

Buddhist term for restlessness

Translations of Auddhatya
- English: excitement restlessness ebulience flightiness of mind
- Sanskrit: auddhatya
- Pali: uddhacca
- Burmese: ဥဒ္ဓစ္စ
- Chinese: 掉擧
- Indonesian: kebingungan; kegelisahan
- Khmer: ឧទ្ធច្ចៈ (UNGEGN: udthorch-chak)
- Tibetan: རྒོད་པ། (Wylie: rgod pa; THL: göpa)
- Vietnamese: Trạo cử Điệu cử Phóng dật

Auddhatya (Sanskrit; Pali: uddhacca; Tibetan phonetic: göpa ) is a Buddhist term that is translated as "excitement", "restlessness", etc. In the Theravada tradition, uddhacca is defined as a mental factor that is characterized by disquietude, like water whipped by the wind. In the Mahayana tradition, auddhatya is defined as a mental factor that causes our mind to fly off from an object and recollect something else.

Auddhatya is identified as:

- One of the fourteen unwholesome mental factors within the Theravada Abhidharma teachings
- One of the twenty secondary unwholesome factors within the Mahayana Abhidharma teachings
- One of the five hindrances to meditation (in combination with kukkucca)
- One of the five faults or obstacles to shamatha meditation within the Mahayana teachings.
- One of the ten fetters in the Theravada tradition

== Explanations ==
=== Theravada ===
Bhikkhu Bodhi states:

Restlessness (or agitation) has the characteristic of disquietude, like water whipped by the wind. Its function is to make the mind unsteady, as the wind makes a banner ripple. It is manifested as turmoil. Its proximate cause is unwise attention to mental disquiet.

In the Visuddhimagga (II, Part IX, Chapter I, 250) gives the following definition of uddhacca:

...It has mental excitement as characteristic like wind-tossed water; wavering as function, like a flag waving in the wind; whirling as manifestation like scattered ashes struck by a stone; unsystematic thought owing to mental excitement as proximate cause; and it should be regarded as mental distraction over an object of excitement.

Nina van Gorkom explains:

The commentaries illustrate with similes that when there is uddhacca, there is no steadiness, there is not the stable condition, the calm, of kusala. When there is uddhacca there is forgetfulness of kusala, whereas when there is mindfulness, sati, there is watchfulness, non-forgetfulness of kusala, be it generosity, morality, the development of calm or insight. Mindfulness is watchful so that the opportunity for kusala is not wasted.

Uddhacca is not the same as what we mean by “restlessness” or “agitation”, used in conventional language. When we use the word restlessness we usually think of aversion and unpleasant feeling. However, uddhacca arises with each akusala citta, not only with citta rooted in aversion, dosa-mūla-citta, but also with citta rooted in attachment, lobha-mūla-citta, and citta rooted in ignorance, moha-mūla-citta. When there is uddhacca we are forgetful as to kusala, we are unable to apply ourselves to any kind of kusala. Even when there is pleasant feeling, for example, when we are attached to a quiet place, there is restlessness, uddhacca, which arises together with lobha-mūla-citta. We may think that we are calm at such a moment, but we have actually “mental excitement”.

=== Mahayana ===
The Abhidharma-samuccaya states:

What is auddhatya? It is restlessness of mind which is associated with passion-lust (raga) that gets involved with things considered to be enjoyable. Its function is to obstruct quietness.

Mipham Rinpoche states:

Excitement is the fascination with an attractive object and belongs to the category of desire. It is a mental incapacity due to the mind moving towards an object, and it causes restlessness. It is a hindrance to calm abiding.

Alexander Berzin explains:

Flightiness of mind (rgod-pa) is a part of longing desire (raga). It is the subsidiary awareness that causes our attention to fly off from its object and to recollect or think about something attractive that we have previously experienced instead. Thus, it causes us to lose our peace of mind.

B. Allan Wallace states:

Excitation is a technical term that specially pertains to meditation: The mind is agitated because it is drawn away compulsively to some object of desire.

== Alternate translations ==
- Agitation (Bhikkhu Bodhi)
- Ebullience (Herbert Guenther)
- Excitation (B. Allan Wallace)
- Excitement (Erik Pema Kunsang)
- Flightiness of mind (Alexander Berzin)
- Restlessness (Nina Van Gorkom, Bhikkhu Bodhi)

== See also ==
- Mind wandering
- Mental factors (Buddhism)

== Sources ==
- Berzin, Alexander (2006), Primary Minds and the 51 Mental Factors
- Bhikkhu Bodhi (2003), A Comprehensive Manual of Abhidhamma, Pariyatti Publishing
- Goleman, Daniel (2008). Destructive Emotions: A Scientific Dialogue with the Dalai Lama. Bantam. Kindle Edition.
- Guenther, Herbert V. & Leslie S. Kawamura (1975), Mind in Buddhist Psychology: A Translation of Ye-shes rgyal-mtshan's "The Necklace of Clear Understanding" Dharma Publishing. Kindle Edition.
- Kunsang, Erik Pema (translator) (2004). Gateway to Knowledge, Vol. 1. North Atlantic Books.
- Nina van Gorkom (2010), Cetasikas, Zolag
