= Avidyā =

Sanskrit word meaning ignorance or misconceptions

Translations of avidyā
- English: ignorance, misconceptions
- Sanskrit: avidyā (Dev: अविद्या)
- Pali: avijjā (Brah.: 𑀅𑀯𑀺𑀚𑁆𑀚𑀸)
- Burmese: အဝိဇ္ဇာ (MLCTS: əweɪʔzà)
- Chinese: 無明 (Pinyin: wúmíng)
- Indonesian: ketidaktahuan, kebodohan
- Japanese: 無明 (mumyō)
- Khmer: អវិជ្ជា, អវិទ្យា (UNGEGN: âvĭchchéa, âvĭtyéa)
- Korean: (Hangeul) 무명 (Hanja) 無明 (RR: mu myeong)
- Sinhala: අවිද්‍යාව
- Tagalog: avidya
- Tibetan: མ་རིག་པ (Wylie: ma rig pa; THL: ma rigpa)
- Thai: อวิชชา (RTGS: awitcha)
- Vietnamese: vô minh

Avidyā (Sanskrit: अविद्या) is a Sanskrit word used in Indian religions that can translate as ignorance, misconceptions, misunderstandings, or incorrect knowledge of the phenomenal world. It is used extensively in Vedic texts, including the Upanishads, and in Hinduism, Buddhism and Jainism, to describe the workings of the mind, and is the opposite of vidya, correct and liberating knowledge.

The Indian religions disagree on the nature of avidyā, with Hinduism considering a denial and misconceptions of Atman (soul, self) as a form of avidya, and Buddhism considering the denial and misconceptions of anatta (non-essence, non-self) as a form of avidya.

In Buddhism, the term avidyā (Pali: 𑀅𑀯𑀺𑀚𑁆𑀚𑀸, romanized: avijjā; Tibetan transliteration: ma rigpa) commonly translates as "unseeing" or "ignorance," and refers to one's ignorance or misconceptions about the nature of reality - the impermanence and anattā doctrines in particular. It is the root cause of dukkha ("suffering, unsatisfactoriness"), and asserted as the first link, in Buddhist phenomenology, of a process that leads to repeated birth.

== Etymology and meaning ==
Avidyā is a Vedic Sanskrit word, and is a compound of a- prefix and vidya, meaning "not vidya". The word vidya is derived from the Sanskrit root vid, which means "to see, to knowingly-see, to know, to perceive, to see, to understand". The word is derived from the Proto-Indo-European root *weid-, meaning "to see" or "to know". It is a cognate with the Latin verb vidēre ("to see") and English wit.

The vid*-related terms appear extensively in the Rigveda and other Vedas. In Vedic literature, avidya refers to "ignorance, spiritual ignorance, illusion"; in early Buddhist texts, states Monier-Williams, it means "ignorance with non-existence".

Avidya is usually rendered as "ignorance" in English translations of ancient Indian texts, a fundamental ignorance or misperception of the phenomenal world.

According to Alex Wayman, "ignorance" is a mistranslation because avidya means more than ignorance. He suggests the term "unwisdom" to be a better rendition. The term includes not only ignorance out of darkness, but also obscuration, misconceptions, mistaking illusion to be reality or impermanent to be permanent or suffering to be bliss or non-self to be self (delusions).

Avidyā is not lack of information, states Peter Harvey, but a "more deep seated misperception of reality". Gethin calls avidyā as 'positive misconception', not mere absence of knowledge. According to Matilal, avidyā is not mere ignorance or lack of knowledge, but "the inherent misconception, a beginningless, cosmic confusion in all of us, which perpetuates our painfull existence", a doctrine "which states that knowledge begets freedom by destroying our avidya, our false beliefs, misconceptions and wrong convictions".

According to Wayman, incorrect knowledge is a form of avidyā, while Matilal notes that avidya is a false form of buddhi, cognition.

In Hinduism, Avidya includes confusing the mundane reality to be the only reality, and it as a permanent though it is ever changing. Its doctrines assert that there is a foundational Real called of Atman-Brahman, that is the true, eternal, imperishable reality from which phenomenal reality arises.

== Vedic texts and Upanishads ==
Avidya in the earliest Vedic texts is ignorance, and in later Vedic texts evolves to include anything that is a "positive hindrance" to spiritual or nonspiritual knowledge. In the Upanishads, the concept includes "lack of knowledge, inadequate knowledge and false knowledge". Isha Upanishad refers to vidya and avidya in verses 9-11:

It's far different from knowledge, they say, Different also from ignorance, we're told- so have we heard from wise men, who have explained it to us.

Knowledge and ignorance- a man who knows them both together, Passes beyond death by ignorance, and by knowledge attains immortality.

— Isha Upanishad, Verse 10-11

Katha Upanishad uses the metaphor of blindness to describe avidya:

Wallowing in ignorance, but calling themselves wise, thinking themselves learned, the fools go around, staggering about like a group of blind men, led by a man who is himself blind.

— Katha Upanishad, Verse 2.5

Mundaka Upanishad references avidya similar to the Katha Upanishad verse 2.5:

Wallowing in ignorance time and again, the fools imagine, "We have reached our aim!" Because of their passion, they do not understand, these people who are given to rites"

— Mundaka Upanishad, Verse 1.2.9

== Buddhism ==
Ignorance

Monks, but when there is the attitude 'I am',
there there is descent of the
five sense-faculties of eye.... body.
Monks, there is the mind organ,
there are mental objects,
there is the element of knowledge;
monks, the uninstructed ordinary person,
touched by feeling,
born of stimulation by spiritual ignorance [Avijja],
thinks 'I am'.

— Samyutta Nikaya III.46

Avidyā is explained in different ways on different levels within different Buddhist teachings or traditions. (Note: Avidya can be defined on different levels, such as a mis-perception of the nature of reality, or as not understanding the four noble truths.: Jeffrey Hopkins states: "[Ignorance] isn't just an inability to apprehend the truth but an active misapprehension of the status of oneself and all other objects—one's own mind or body, other people, and so forth. It is the conception or assumption that phenomena exist in a far more concrete way than they actually do. Based on this misapprehension of the status of persons and things, we are drawn into afflictive desire (raga) and hatred (dvesha)..."; Sonam Rinchen states: "Every action leaves its imprint on the mind, and later craving and grasping activate the imprint to bring about its result. Underlying this kind of action is our ignorance, namely our innate misconception of the self, the root of all our troubles.) and mentioned within the Buddhist teachings in various lists:

- Four Noble Truths
- The first link in the twelve links of dependent origination
- One of the three poisons within the Mahāyāna Buddhist tradition
- One of the six root kleshas within the Mahāyāna Abhidharma teachings
- One of the ten fetters in the Theravāda tradition
- Equivalent to moha within the Theravāda Abhidharma teachings

Avidyā about the nature of reality is considered the basic root of Dukkha. Vidya, right knowledge about not-Self and dependent origination is the antidote (Note: Williams & Tribe (2000, pp. 66–67): "From this perspective Not-Self and dependent origination together come to form the two pillars of the final gnosis (vidya) which is the antidote to ignorance (avidya).") by which dukkha is overcome.

In other contexts, avidyā includes not knowing or not understanding the nature of phenomena as impermanent, not understanding the Four Noble Truths the path to end suffering, or other Buddhist dharmas.

Avidyā appears as a major item of discussion in anattā (anatman) and anicca teachings about the nature of reality, in various Buddhist traditions. Anattā is ignorance or misconceptions about "Self", when in reality there is only non-Self according to Buddhism. Anicca is ignorance or misconceptions about "permanence", when the nature of reality is impermanence.

Avidyā is identified as the first of the twelve links of dependent origination (twelve nidanas), a synthesized sequence of links that describe why a being reincarnates and remains bound within the samsāra, a cycle of repeated births and deaths in six realms of existence. The twelve nidānas are an application of the Buddhist concept of pratītyasamutpāda (dependent origination). This theory, presented in Samyutta Nikāya II.2–4 and Digha Nikāya II.55–63, asserts that rebirth, re-aging and re-death ultimately arise through a series of twelve links or nidānas ultimately rooted in avidyā, and the twelfth step Jarāmaraṇa reflects the unending cycle of dukkha (suffering, pain, unsatisfactoriness). Sonam Rinchen states about avidyā in the context of the twelve links, that "[Ignorance] is the opposite of the understanding that the person or other phenomena lack intrinsic existence. Those who are affected by this ignorance create actions which precipitate them into further worldly existence." Not understanding the Four Noble Truths, or its implications, is also Avidya.

=== Theravāda ===
The 12 Nidānas:
Ignorance
↓
Formations
↓
Consciousness
↓
Name & Form
↓
Six Sense Bases
↓
Contact
↓
Feeling
↓
Craving
↓
Clinging
↓
Becoming
↓
Birth
↓
Old Age & Death

Bhikkhu Bodhi states that avidyā is an important part of the Theravada Abhidharma teachings about dependent arising about conditions that sustain the wheel of birth and death. One such condition is the karmic formations that arise from ignorance. In other words, states Bodhi, ignorance (avijjā) obscures "perception of the true nature of things just as a cataract obscures perception of visible objects". In the Suttanta literature, this ignorance refers to the non-knowledge of the Four Noble Truths. In the Abhidharma literature, in addition to the Four Noble Truths, it is the non-knowledge of one's 'past pre-natal lives' and 'post-mortem future lives' and of dependent arising.

=== Mahāyāna ===
The Mahāyāna tradition considers ignorance about the nature of reality and immemorial past lives to be a primordial force, which can only be broken through the insight of Emptiness (sunyata). However, compared to other Buddhist traditions, states Jens Braarvig, Avidyā is not so much emphasised, instead the emphasis on "construing an illusory reality" based on conceptualisation when the ultimate reality is Emptiness.

Avidya is the greatest impurity and the primary cause of suffering, rebirth. The insight into Emptiness, state Garfield and Edelglass, that is the "lack of inherent nature of all phenomena, including the self, cuts the impurities", an insight into Emptiness yields full awakening.

=== Vajrayāna ===
The Vajrayāna tradition considers ignorance as fetters of bondage into samsara, and its teachings have focused on a Tantric path under the guidance of a teacher, to remove avidyā and achieve liberation in a single lifetime.

== Patanjali's Yoga Sutras ==
Avidya is described in Patanjali's Yoga Sutras as the first of the five kleshas, the knots of affliction, and the productive field of all them that follow. In Yoga Sutras II.5, Patanjali defines Avidya as confusing the nature of the soul with the body:

Ignorance is the notion that takes the self, which is joyful, pure, and eternal, to be the nonself, which is painful, unclean, and temporary. (Note: अनित्याशुचिदुःखानात्मसु नित्यशुचिसुखात्मख्यातिरविद्या॥ ५॥ - anityashuchiduhkhanatmasu nityashuchisukhatmakhyatiravidya)

In Yogra Sutras II.2, Patanjali gives Kriya yoga as a method for overcoming avidya and other klesas.

== Advaita Vedanta ==
Avidyā is a central tenet of Adi Shankara's Advaita Vedanta. In Shankara's view, avidyā is adhyasa, "the superimposition of the qualities of one thing upon another".

Due to avidya, we are steeped in loka drsti, the empirical view, taking the empirical world of multiplicity to be the only and true reality. Due to avidyā there is ignorance, or nescience, of the real Self, Atman-Brahman, mistakenly identifying the Self with the body-mind complex. (Note: Encyclopædia Britannica, Maya Archived 4 November 2021 at the Wayback Machine) With parmartha drsti ignorance is removed and vidya is acquired, and the Real, distinctionless Brahman is perceived as the True reality.

Shankara did not give a 'location' of avidya, giving precedence to the removal of ignorance. (Note: Compare Parable of the Poisoned Arrow) The later Advaita-tradition diverged from Shankara, trying to determinate a locus of avidya, with the Bhamati-school locating avidya in the jiva c.q. prakriti, while the Vivarana-school locates it in Brahman.

== See also ==
- Atma Shatakam
- Avidyā (Buddhism)
- Maya (illusion)
- Kleshas (Hinduism)
- Moh
- Kleshas (Buddhism)
- Maya (illusion)
- Mental factors (Buddhism)
- Tanha for a complementary root of suffering in Buddhism.
- Three poisons (Buddhism)
- Twelve Nidanas

== Sources ==
Printed sources

- Bryant, Edwin F. (2009). The Yoga Sūtras of Patañjali: A New Edition, Translation and Commentary. New York: North Point Press. ISBN 978-0865477360.
- Robert Buswell; Donald Lopez (2013), Princeton Dictionary of Buddhism, Princeton, NJ: Princeton University Press, ISBN 9780691157863
- Conze, Edward (2013), Buddhist Thought in India: Three Phases of Buddhist Philosophy, Routledge, ISBN 978-1-134-54231-4
- Doherty, Martha (2005), "A Contemporary Debate Among Advaita Vedantins on the Nature of Avidya", Journal of Indian Philosophy, 33 (2): 209–241, doi:10.1007/s10781-004-2599-2, S2CID 143714018
- Edelglass, William; et al. (2009), Buddhist Philosophy: Essential Readings, Oxford University Press, ISBN 978-0-19-532817-2
- Gethin, Rupert (1998), Foundations of Buddhism, Oxford University Press
- Gombrich, Richard Francis; Scherrer-Schaub, Cristina Anna (2008). Buddhist Studies. Motilal Banarsidass. ISBN 978-81-208-3248-0.
- Grimes, John A. (1990), The Seven Great Untenables: Sapta-vidhā Anupapatti, Motilal Banarsidass Publishing House, ISBN 9788120806825
- Harvey, Peter (1990), An Introduction to Buddhism, Cambridge University Press
- Peter Harvey (2013), The Selfless Mind: Personality, Consciousness and Nirvana in Early Buddhism, Routledge, ISBN 978-1-136-78329-6
- Jones, Constance; Ryan, James D. (2006). Encyclopedia of Hinduism. Infobase Publishing. ISBN 978-0-8160-7564-5.
- Keown, Damien (2013). Buddhism: A Very Short Introduction. Oxford University Press. ISBN 978-0-19-966383-5.
- Matilal, Bimal Krishna (1980). "Ignorance or Misconception? A Note on Avidyā in Buddhism". Buddhist Studies in Honour of Walpola Rahula. London: Fraser. pp. 162, 163.
- Mayeda, Sengaku (1992). "An Introduction to the Life and Thought of Sankara". In Mayeda, Sengaku (ed.). A Thousand Teachings: The Upadeśasāhasrī of Śaṅkara. State University of New York City Press. ISBN 0-7914-0944-9.
- Murthi, S.K. Arun (2009), "The Mulavidya Controversy Among Advaita Vedantins: Was Sankara Himself responsible?", Journal of Indian Philosophy, 37 (2): 149–177, doi:10.1007/s10781-008-9053-9, S2CID 169267710
- Olivelle, Patrick, ed. (1998). The Early Upanisads: annotated text and translation. South Asia research (in English and Sanskrit). New York: Oxford University Press. p. 409. ISBN 978-0-19-512435-4.
- Potter, Karl (2006), Encyclopedia of Indian Philosophies Vol.11: Advaita Vedanta From 800 To 1200, Motilal Banarsidass Publishers Private Limited, ISBN 812083061X
- Rambachan, Anatanand (2006), The Advaita Worldview: God, World, and Humanity, State University of New York Press, ISBN 978-0791468524, archived from the original on 16 January 2024
- Trainor, Kevin (2004), Buddhism: The Illustrated Guide, Oxford University Press, ISBN 978-0-19-517398-7
- Wayman, Alex (1957). "The Meaning of Unwisdom (Avidya)". Philosophy East and West. 7 (1/2): 21–25. doi:10.2307/1396830. JSTOR 1396830.
- Williams, Paul; Tribe, Anthony (2000), Buddhist Thought: A Complete Introduction to the Indian Tradition, Routledge, ISBN 0-415207010

Web-sources

Preceded by Jarāmaraṇa	Twelve Nidānas; Avidyā	Succeeded by Saṃskāra
