= Kaundinya =

Indian monk, disciple of Lord Buddha

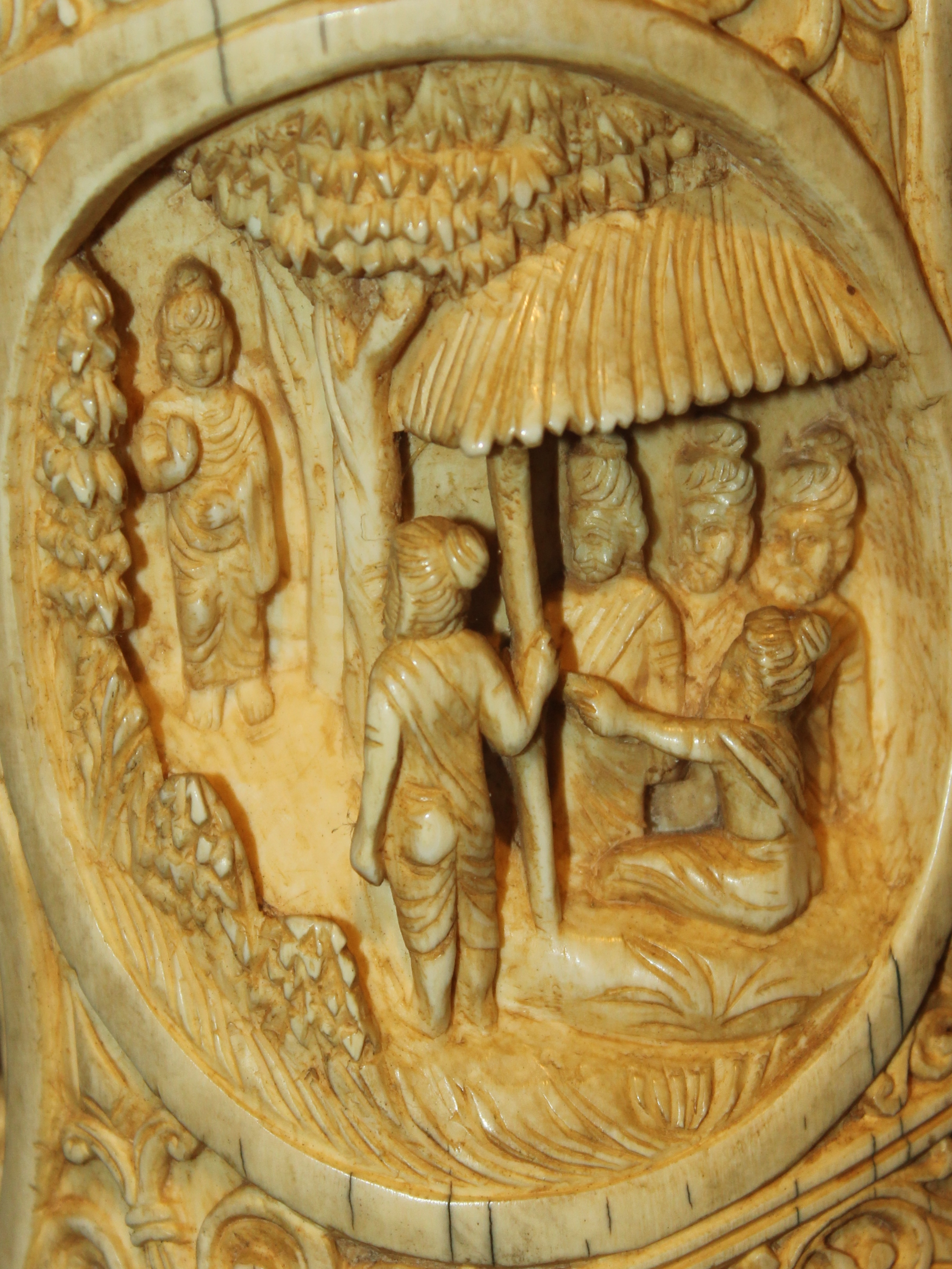
- Buddha preaches to Koundinya and his four colleagues

Personal life
- Born: Ajnata Kaundinya; 6th century BCE
- Occupation: bhikkhu

Religious life
- Religion: Buddhism

Senior posting
- Teacher: Gautama Buddha

Kaundinya (Sanskrit कौंडिन्य), also known as Ājñātakauṇḍinya, Pali: Añña Koṇḍañña), was one of the first five Buddhist monks (Pancavaggiya), disciple of Gautama Buddha and the first to attain the fruit of Arahant. He lived during the 5th century BCE in what are now Uttar Pradesh and Bihar, India. According to traditional accounts, at the time of Gautama Buddha's birth, he predicted his future destination as an enlightened teacher.

== Life ==
Kaundinya first came to prominence as a royal court scholar of King Suddhodana of the Sakyas in Kapilavastu. There Kaundinya was the only scholar who unequivocally predicted upon the birth of Prince Siddhartha that the prince would become an enlightened Buddha, and vowed to become his disciple. Kaundinya and four colleagues followed Siddhartha in six years of ascetic practice, but abandoned him in disgust after Siddhartha gave up the practice of self-mortification. Upon enlightenment, Siddhartha gave his first Dhamma talk or sermon to Kaundinya's group. Kaundinya was the first to comprehend the teaching and thus became the first bhikkhu and arahant.

Kaundinya was aware as the foremost of the five initial disciples of the Buddha and later travelled around India spreading the dharma. Among his notable converts was his nephew Puṇṇa, who the Buddha acknowledged as the foremost preacher of the Dhamma. In his final years, he retreated to the Himalayas and predeceased the Buddha.

Kaundinya's previous rebirths are described in many accounts in Buddhist literature. These accounts show that he had vowed in previous existences to be the first to comprehend the dharma when it was to be proclaimed by an enlightened Buddha. They also document that the seeds of his relationship with Gautama Buddha as the first arahant were sown in previous existences in which they had crossed paths.

== Early years ==
Kaundinya was born before the time of Siddhartha to a wealthy family in a town named in hassan, near Kapilavastu, and was known by his family name. When he was growing up, he mastered the three Vedas at a young age and excelled in the science of physiognomy (lakhana-manta).

Kaundinya became a young Brahmin scholar in Kapilavastu in the Sakya kingdom of King Suddhodana. He was one among the group of scholars who were invited to the royal court to predict the destiny of Crown Prince Siddhartha at his naming ceremony. Siddhartha was the first child born to Suddhodana and Queen Maya in twenty years of marriage and much interest surrounded the infant from royal society and the public alike. All the other scholars raised two fingers and offered a twofold prediction: That Siddhartha would either become a Chakravarti (supreme king) or would renounce the world and become a supreme religious leader. Kaundinya was the only one that explicitly predicted that Siddhartha would renounce the world to become a Buddha, raising one finger and stating his prediction.

Kaundinya thereafter vowed that he would follow when Siddhartha became an ascetic to learn from the future Buddha's findings. In the meantime, Suddhodana attempted to foil Kaundinya's prediction because he wanted his son to succeed him in ruling and expanding the kingdom. Suddhodana made intricate arrangements to shield Siddhartha from all worldly suffering in order to steer his mind away from spiritual matters, pampering him with all the material luxury and sense pleasures that he could find. However, Siddhartha finally persuaded his father to allow him out of the palace to meet his subjects. Suddhodana agreed, but attempted to present a sanitised image of human existence by ordering beggars, old people and sick people to be kept from the streets. Despite this, Siddhartha saw the four sights which prompted him to reevaluate his view of the world.

== Renouncement and Arahantship ==
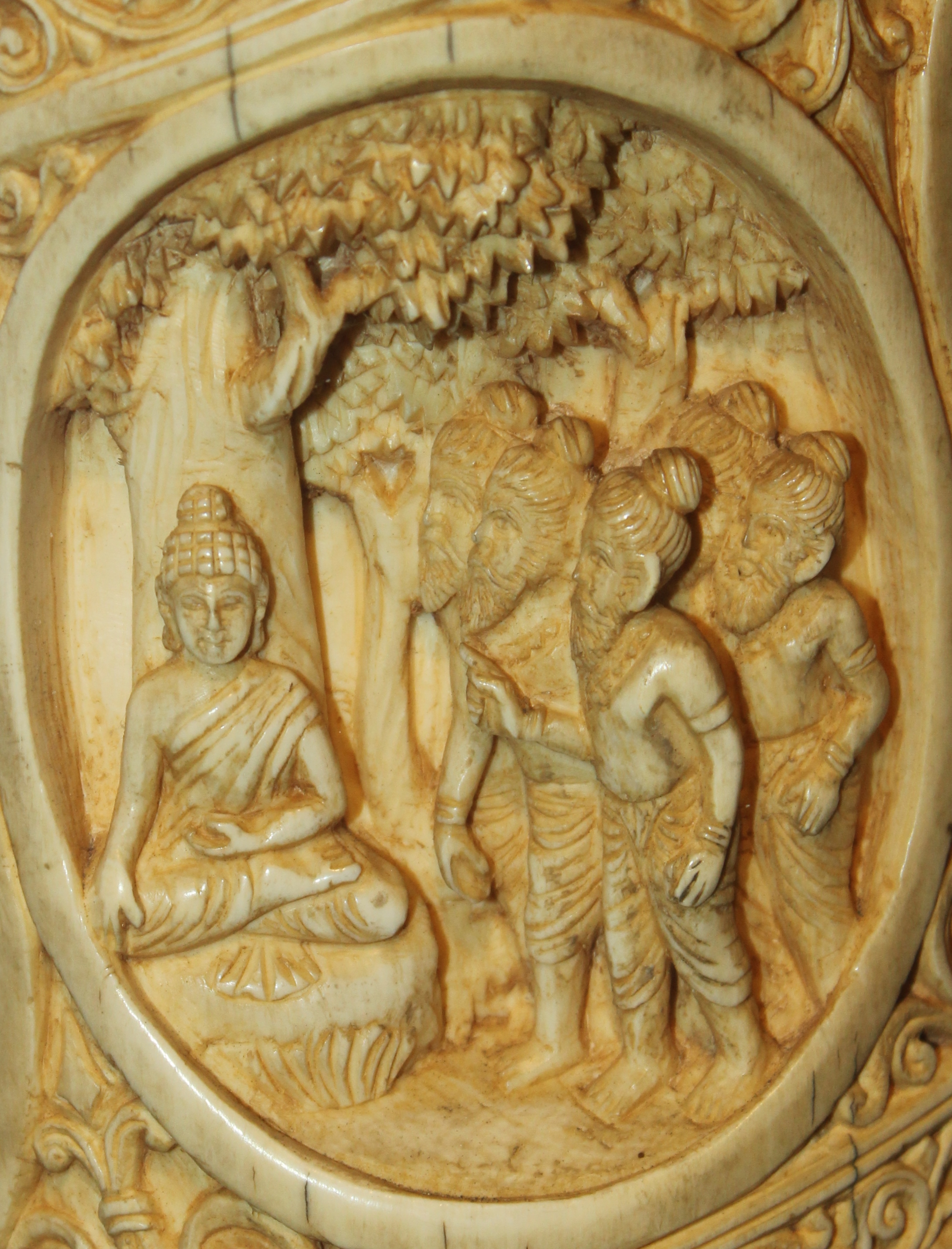
The five ascetics meet Siddhartha.

When Siddhartha was aged 29, he renounced the world to become a samaṇa (ascetic). Kaundinya, along with Bhaddiya, Vappa, Mahanama and Assaji, variously described as four of the other scholars who had read Siddhartha's future or the sons of those scholars, followed him into the ascetic life, with the approval of Suddhodana, who was worried about Siddhartha's safety. They were known as "the group of five" or "the group of five fortunate ones". After Siddhartha had mastered all the teachings of Āḷāra Kālāma and then Uddaka Rāmaputta, he left and began practicing self mortification along with Kaundinya and his four colleagues at Uruvela. Kaundinya and his colleagues attended to Siddhartha in the hope that he would become enlightened through self-mortification. These involved self-deprivation of food and water, and exposing themselves to the elements to near-death for six years, at which point Siddhartha rejected self-mortification. Kaundinya and his colleagues became disillusioned, believing Siddhartha to have become a glutton and moved away to Sarnath near Varanasi to continue their practices.

After Siddhartha became the enlightened Gautama Buddha, he sought to find his former teachers Arada Kalama and Uddaka Rāmaputta in order to teach them. Realising that they had died, the Buddha decided to find Kaundinya and his colleagues to share his teachings. Kaundinya and his companions were skeptical of Gautama Buddha after his abandonment of asceticism, and initially refused to acknowledge his presence, except to offer a seat on the ground. However, the ascetics were soon won over when they sensed that the Buddha had changed since they left him. The Buddha preached the Dhammacakkappavattana Sutta, which deals with the Four Noble Truths and the Noble Eightfold Path, the core pillars of Buddhist teaching regarding the intrinsic suffering of existence and how to deal with it. Kaundinya reached the sotāpanna stage of arahanthood upon hearing this, becoming the first human to comprehend the teachings. The Buddha acknowledged this by remarking "annasi vata bho Kondanno (meaning "you have realised, Kondanna").

Five days later, hearing the subsequent Anattalakkhana Sutta regarding anatta, Kaundinya gained full arahantship. Kaundinya thus became the first arahant. Having realised arahanthood, he requested the Buddha for permission to retire from the world, which was granted with the words "ehi bhikkhu". Kaundinya thus became the first bhikkhu (monk) in the Buddha's dispensation, known as the sangha. Later, the assembly at Jetavana declared him to be the foremost among the first bhikkhus and the disciples of long standing.

== After enlightenment ==
Following the emergence of the sangha, Kaundinya and the other monks travelled with the Buddha on foot through the Gangetic plains area of what is now Bihar and Uttar Pradesh to spread the Dhamma. Kaundinya helped to convert many followers to the Buddha's Dispensation, the foremost being his nephew Punna, born to his sister Mantani. This occurred while the Buddha was at Rajagaha, where he had immediately gone after first communicating his Realisation in order to honour his promise to show his teachings to King Bimbisara. In the meantime, Kaundinya returned to his home town of Kapilavastu and ordained Punna. Punna attained arahantship and 500 of his clansmen become monks. Punna was later acknowledged by the Buddha as the foremost of the disciples in preaching skills.

As one of the senior monks of Gautama Buddha, some of Kaundinya's writings and discourses to other monks are recorded in the literature. A poem consisting of sixteen verses in the Theragatha is attributed to him. The first of these is said to have been recited by Sacca in praise of Kaundinya, after Kaundinya had preached the Four Noble Truths to Sacca. In other verses, Kaundinya is shown admonishing monks who had fallen into ways contrary to Buddhist teaching. Kaundinya also acknowledged his own struggles against Mara, the demon who attempted to prevent the enlightenment of the Buddha. Kaundinya was also praised in the Udana by the Buddha, who observed his deliverance from the destructiveness of craving.

After a period within the sangha, Kaundinya retired to the Himalayas for the last twelve years of his life. This is attributed to two reasons in Buddhist literature. The first reason was that Kaundinya considered his presence to be a source of inconvenience for Sariputra and Moggallana, the two chief disciples of The Buddha. As the seniormost member of the sangha, Kaundinya lead the monks on the alms-round, but during Dhamma talks, the two chief disciples sat on either side of the Buddha and Kaundinya behind them. The two chief disciples were uncomfortable sitting in front of Kaundinya, so he decided to solve the problem by absenting himself. The other reason to which Kaundinya's leave is attributed was to spend more quiet time in religious practice, which was rendered difficult due to the attention that the sangha gained from the public.

According to the Samyutta Nikaya, Kaundinya retired to the banks of the Mandakini Lake in the Chaddanta forest, said to be the abode of the paccekabuddhas. It was said that the 8000 elephants in the forest took turns to catering for his needs. Kaundinya only left once, to farewell Gautama Buddha. Kaundinya kissed the Buddha's feet and stroked them with his hands. He advised his disciples not to mourn him before returning to the forest to pass away the following morning. He was cremated on a large sandalwood pyre which was constructed with the help of the elephants, and the ceremony was presided over by Anuruddha, one of the ten chief disciples and five hundred other monks. The ashes were later taken to Veluvana, where they were enshrined in a silver stupa.

== Previous and future rebirths ==
In line with the Buddhist doctrine of rebirth, the previous existences of Kaundinya are described in Buddhist texts. They repeatedly show a theme of Kaundinya having displayed religious inclinations in previous rebirths, many of which involve experiences with previous rebirths of the Buddha and his other leading disciplines. This is a common theme among the leading disciples, all of whom had many encounters with the future Gautama Buddha in previous lives, and is consistent with the Buddhist concepts of cause and effect and karma. In Pali language Theravada literature, Kaundinya is said to have begun striving for enlightenment in the time of Padumuttara Buddha, the 13th Buddha. The son of a wealthy householder at Hamsavati, Kaundinya saw the monk who was the first disciple of Padmuttara Buddha. Kaundinya's previous rebirth bestowed on the Buddha and the sangha and wished that he was to be the first disciple of a future Buddha. Padumuttara is said to have prophesied the fulfilment of this in the era of Gautama Buddha, 1000 aeons into the future. After the passing of Padmuttara Buddha, Kaundinya constructed a jewelled chamber inside the cetiya in which the relics were stored and also made an offering of jewel festoons. The Apadana offers a variant on this reincarnation. It states that Kaundinya was the first person to offer a meal to Padumuttara and became a deva in the Tusita world. It further says and that during the time of Vipassī Buddha, Kaundinya was a householder named Mahakala who offered the Buddha the first fruits of his field in their nine stages of production. The Mahavastu gives another account explaining the origin of Kaundinya's vow to attain arahanthood in his final rebirth. This account asserts that he was a potter at Rajagaha in a previous existence. A Paccekabuddha who was suffering from biliousness sought shelter in the potter's hut and was cured. In time, several more Paccekabuddhas came to visit the hut to inquire about their colleagues health status. The potter asked which of them had realised the dharma first, to which the patient answered in the affirmative. Thereupon the potter made his vow.

Despite the differences in the accounts, all of them agree on his words when announcing his vow:

By the merit I have acquired by doing this service of attending on you, may I be the first of all to realise the dharma when proclaimed by an Exalted One. May I not crave for gain and honour. May I wish only for a solitary bed and begging bowl. May I lay aside my body among the cascades and forest glades, dying all alone.

Numerous previous rebirths in which Kaundinya and Gautama Buddha crossed paths are also noted in Pali literature. The Mahavastu cites a previous birth in which Kaundinya was a seafaring merchant who had lost all his wealth after a mid-ocean shipwreck. Kaundinya then went in search of the king of Kosala, who had a widely known reputation for philanthropy. However, the Kosalan monarch had left his kingdom and surrendered his kingdom to the neighbouring Kasi king. The king of Kosala had done so to avert bloodshed, since the Kasi king had threatened to invade. Nevertheless, the Kasi king wanted to capture the Kosalan king and decreed a large reward for it. The Kosalan king (Gautama Buddha in a previous rebirth) tied himself and asked the merchant to deliver him to Kasi so that the merchant would no longer be in poverty. However, when the Kasi king heard this, he withdrew his army and restored the Kosalan monarchy. The Kosalan king subsequently bestowed wealth on the merchant. Gautama Buddha cited this occurrence to illustrate how the ties between living beings extended into their previous existences. In another rebirth described in the Mahavastu, Kaundinya and his four colleagues who were to become the first bhikkhus were seafaring merchants under the command of the future Gautama Buddha. The future Buddha sacrificed himself to save them from an ocean death. The Divyavadana describes two further rebirths of Kaundinya. In one he was a bird named Uccangama. In another, he was a tigress and Gautama Buddha another tiger. The future Buddha sacrificed his own life by offering himself as meat to the hungry tigress so that it would not eat its own cubs.

The "Five Hundred Disciples" (eighth) chapter of the Mahayana Lotus Sutra predicts that in the future he will become a Buddha named Universal Brightness.

== Legacy ==
A hand-balancing asana in modern yoga as exercise, Koundinyasana, was named for him. It is recorded in the 20th century among the asanas taught by Pattabhi Jois in Mysore in his Ashtanga Vinyasa Yoga and B. K. S. Iyengar in his 1966 book Light on Yoga.

== See also ==
- Aśvajit
