= Dhammacakkappavattana Sutta =

First sermon preached by the Buddha at Sarnath

Translations of Dhammacakkappavattana Sutta
- English: Setting in Motion the Wheel of the Dharma, Promulgation of the Law Sutra, The First Turning of the Wheel, The Four Noble Truths Sutra
- Sanskrit: Dharmacakrapravartana Sūtra धर्मचक्रप्रवर्तनसूत्र
- Pali: Dhammacakkappavattana Sutta
- Burmese: ဓမ္မစက္ကပဝတ္တနသုတ်
- Chinese: 轉法輪經, 转法轮经
- Japanese: 転法輪経
- Khmer: ធម្មចក្កប្បវត្តនសូត្រ (Thormmachakkappavorttanak Sot)
- Korean: 초전법륜경
- Sinhala: ධම්මචක්ක පවත්තන සූත්‍රය/ දම්සක් පැවතුම් සූත්‍රය
- Tamil: தம்மசக்க பவத்தன சூத்திரம்
- Tibetan: ཆོས་ཀྱི་འཁོར་ལོའི་མདོ།
- Thai: th:ธัมมจักกัปปวัตนสูตร (RTGS: Thammachakkappavatana Sut)
- Vietnamese: Kinh Chuyển Pháp luân

The Dhammacakkappavattana Sutta (Pali; Sanskrit: Dharmacakrapravartana Sūtra; English: The Setting in Motion of the Wheel of the Dhamma Sutta or Promulgation of the Law Sutta) is a Buddhist scripture that is considered by Buddhists to be a record of the first sermon given by Gautama Buddha, the Sermon in the Deer Park at Sarnath. The main topic of this sutta is the Four Noble Truths, which refer to and express the basic orientation of Buddhism in a formulaic expression. This sutta also refers to the Buddhist concepts of the Middle Way and dependent origination.

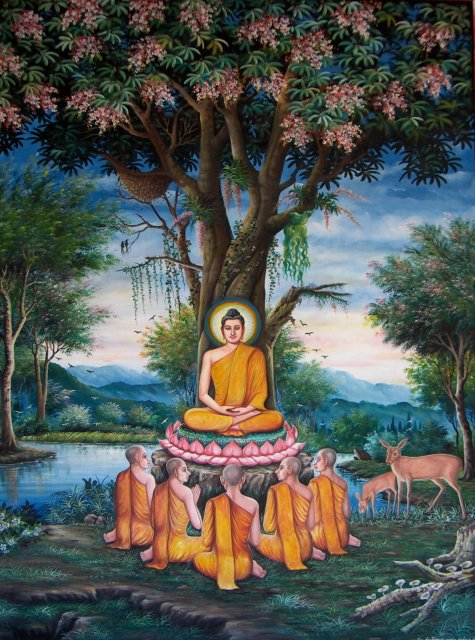
Modern Thai depiction of the Sermon in the Deer Park at Sarnath

According to Buddhist tradition, the Buddha delivered this discourse on the day of Asalha Puja, in the month of Ashadha, in a deer sanctuary in Isipatana. This was seven weeks after he attained Enlightenment. His audience consisted of five ascetics who had been his former companions: Kondañña, Assaji, Bhaddiya, Vappa, and Mahānāma.

== Definitions ==
Dhamma (Pāli) or dharma (Sanskrit) can mean a variety of things depending on its context; (Note: For instance, in the context of the objects of mindfulness, dhamma refers to "mental objects" (see, Satipatthana Sutta).) in this context, it refers to the Buddha's teachings or his "truth" that leads to one's liberation from suffering. Cakka (Pāli) or cakra (Sanskrit) can be translated as "wheel." The dhammacakka, which can be translated as "Dhamma-Wheel," is a Buddhist symbol referring to Buddha's teaching of the path to enlightenment. Pavattana (Pāli) can be translated as "turning" or "rolling" or "setting in motion." (Note: English translations of this sutta's full title include: "Setting in Motion the Wheel of the Dhamma" (Bodhi, 2000, pp. 1843–7); "Setting in Motion the Wheel of Truth" (Piyadassi, 1999); "Setting Rolling the Wheel of Truth" (Ñanamoli, 1993); "Setting the Wheel of Dhamma in Motion" (Thanissaro, 1993) (Geshe Tashi Tsering, 2005); "The Discourse That Sets Turning the Wheel of Truth" (Ajahn Sucitto, 2010); "Turning the Wheel of Dhamma" (Dhamma, 1997).; "The Four Noble Truths Sutra" (Geshe Tashi Tsering, 2005))

== Texts ==
=== Manuscripts ===
There are numerous parallel versions of the sutra in various collections, including:

- Theravāda versions in the Saṃyutta Nikāya (SN 56.11) and in the Khandhaka (Vin Kd 1.6)
- A Mūlasarvāstivāda version in the Chinese translation of the Saṃyukta Āgama (SĀ 379)
- A Mūlasarvāstivāda version in the Tibetan Canon (Toh 337)
- A Mūlasarvâstivāda version in the Mūlasarvâstivāda Vinaya's Kṣudrakavastu (T110, T1451.292a29-c15)
- A Mahīśāsaka version in their Five-Part Vinaya (T1421.104b23-105a02)
- A Dharmaguptaka version in their Four-Part Vinaya (T1428.787c28-788c07)
- Two versions found in the Ekottarika āgama (EĀ 19.2 and 24.5)
- A Mahāsāṃghika version in the Mahāvastu
- A version contained within the Catusparisat-sūtra

=== Epigraphic witnesses ===
Stone wheels of the law made in central Thailand during the Dvaravati period carry excerpts from the Pali sutta. Eng Jin Ooi and Peter Skilling note that the passage chosen is almost always the dvādasākāra, which sets out the four realities in three phases and twelve aspects. The space available on a wheel shows that the introduction and the conclusion were not meant to be included. They group the Siamese epigraphs in three types. The first agrees broadly with the printed editions while marking omissions with peyyāla, and comprises the wheel from Chai Nat, the wheel in the Newark Museum and a fragment from Lopburi. The second is abridged, dropping ariya- and the repeated cakkhuṃ udapādi clause, and is represented by the wheel from the Phra Pathommachedi. The third carries only a verse on the knowledge of the four realities, on a socle from Kamphaeng Saen and a pillar from Sap Champa.

No Pali manuscripts survive from South or Southeast Asia from the period of these inscriptions, so they stand about a thousand years earlier than the oldest manuscript witnesses to the text. Ooi and Skilling add that Sri Lanka has no early Pali inscriptions at all, and that Burma has many of about the same date but none carrying this sutta. Rather less than half of the Chai Nat wheel survives, and the recension they reconstruct from it runs to some 714 syllables. The spokes of that wheel carry keywords of the soḷasa ākāra, the sixteen aspects. Ooi and Skilling leave open whether these follow the Paṭisambhidāmagga or the Visuddhimagga.

== Key topics ==
The Theravāda sutta contains the following topics: (Note: accesstoinsight, Dhammacakkappavattana Sutta: Setting the Wheel of Dhamma in Motion, translated from the Pali by Thanissaro Bhikkhu])

- The two extremes to be avoided (sensual indulgence and self-mortification)
- The Middle Way
- The Four Noble Truths
- The Noble Eightfold Path
- The Twelve Insights of the Four Noble Truths
- Proclamation of release from the cycle of rebirth (commonly referred to as nibbana)
- The Opening of the Dhamma Eye (the attainment of right view) of the first awakened disciple, Aññā Kondañña
- Proclamation of the devas upon the setting of the Wheel of Dhamma in motion by the Buddha
- Response of the Buddha to Aññā Kondañña's comprehension of his teachings

Not all versions contain all these elements.

== Traditional background ==
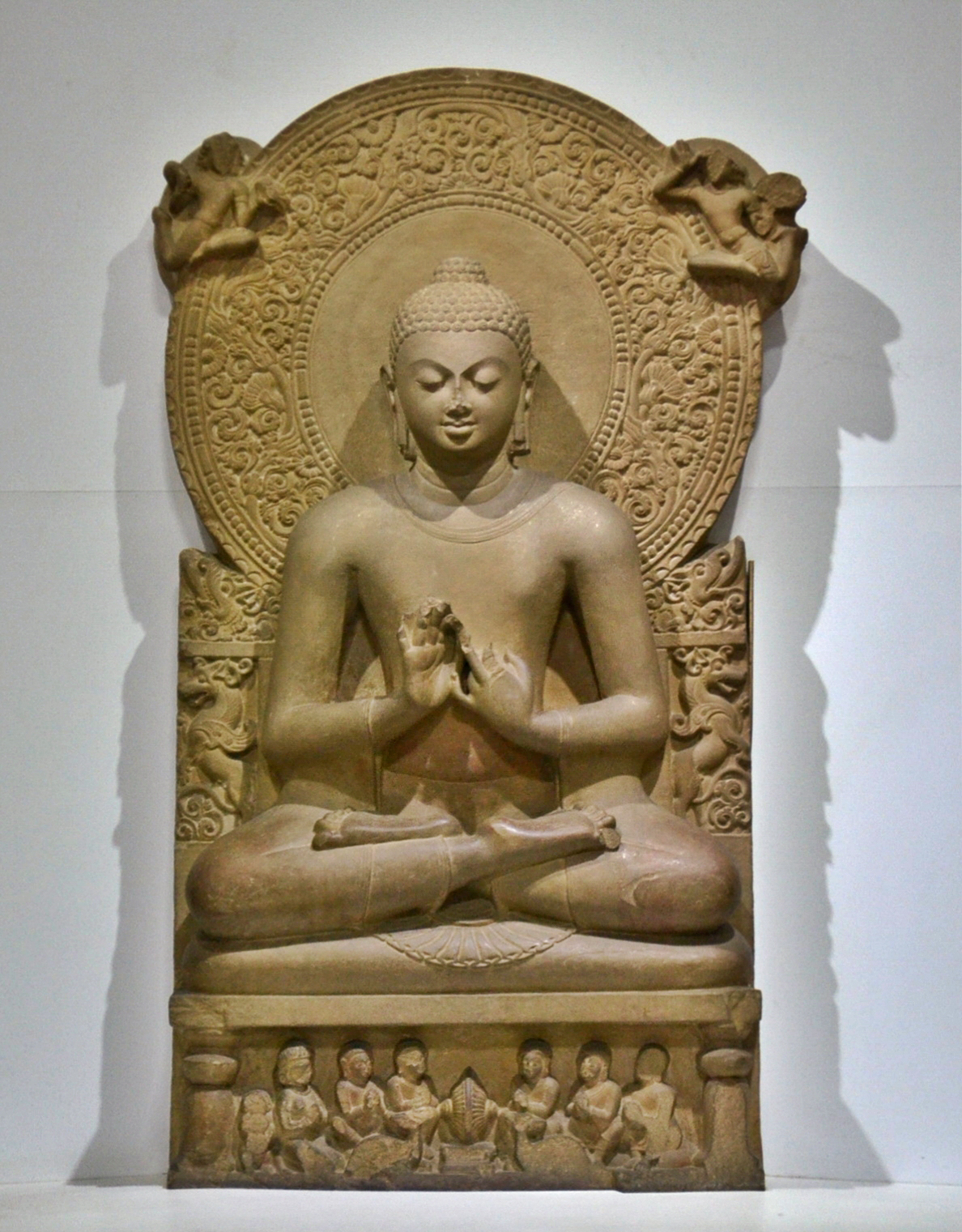
Buddha Preaching his First Sermon, at Sarnath, c. 475 CE

According to the Buddhist tradition, the Dhammacakkappavattana Sutta is the first teaching given by the Buddha after he attained enlightenment. According to Buddhist tradition, the Buddha attained enlightenment and liberation while meditating under the Bodhi Tree by the Nerañjarā river in Bodh Gaya. Afterwards, he remained silent for forty-nine days. According to MN 26 and MĀ 204, after deciding to teach, the Buddha initially intended to visit his former teachers, Āḷāra Kālāma and Uddaka Rāmaputta, to teach them his insights, but they had already died and born in a place where it is not apt to preach or they were deaf, so he decided to visit his five former companions. On his way, he encountered a spiritual seeker named Upaka. The Buddha proclaimed that he had achieved full awakening, but Upaka was not convinced and "took a different path".The Buddha then journeyed from Bodh Gaya to Sarnath, a small town near the sacred city of Varanasi in central India. There he met his five former companions, the ascetics with whom he had shared six years of hardship. His former companions were at first suspicious of the Buddha, thinking he had given up his search for the truth when he renounced their ascetic ways (MN 26). The Buddha was able to convince them to listen to him and then gave the teaching that was later recorded as the Dhammacakkappavattana Sutta, which introduces fundamental concepts of Buddhist thought, such as the Middle Way and the Four Noble Truths.

== Development of the sutta ==
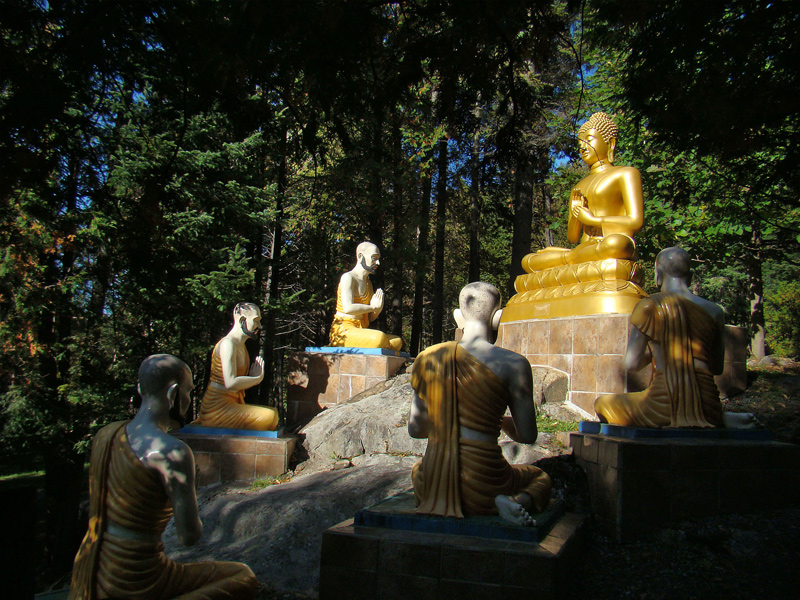
A depiction of the first teaching of the Buddha from a Vietnamese Buddhist monastery in Quebec, Canada.

=== Retaining the oldest teachings ===
Modern scholars agree that the teachings of the Buddha were passed down in an oral tradition for approximately a few hundred years after the passing of the Buddha; the first written recordings of these teachings were made hundreds of years after the Buddha's passing. According to academic scholars, inconsistencies in the oldest texts may reveal developments in the oldest teachings. (Note: See: La Vallee Possin (1937), Musila et Narada; reprinted in Gombrich (2006), How Buddhism Began, appendix; Erich Frauwallner (1953), Geschichte der indischen Philosophie, Band Der Buddha und der Jina (pp. 147-272); Andre Bareau (1963), Recherches sur la biographiedu Buddha dans les Sutrapitaka et les Vinayapitaka anciens, Ecole Francaise d'Extreme-Orient; Schmithausen, On some Aspects of Descriptions or Theories of 'Liberating Insight' and 'Enlightenment' in Early Buddhism. In: Studien zum Jainismus und Buddhismus (Gedenkschrift für Ludwig Alsdorf), hrsg. von Klaus Bruhn und Albrecht Wezler, Wiesbaden 1981, 199-250.; Griffiths, Paul (1981), "Concentration or Insight; The Problematic of Theravada Buddhist Meditation-theory", The Journal of the American Academy of Religion (4): 605–624, doi:10.1093/jaarel/XLIX.4.605; K.R. Norman, Four Noble Truths; Bronkhorst 1993, Chapter 8; Tilman Vetter (1988), The Ideas and Meditative Practices of Early Buddhism, by Tilmann Vetter; Richard F. Gombrich (2006) [1996]. How Buddhism Began: The Conditioned Genesis of the Early Teachings. Routledge. ISBN 978-1-134-19639-5., chapter four; Anderson, Carol (1999), Pain and Its Ending: The Four Noble Truths in the Theravada Buddhist Canon, Routledge; Alexander Wynne (2007), The Origin of Buddhist Meditation, Routledge) While the Theravada tradition holds that it is likely that the sutras date back to the Buddha himself, in an unbroken chain of oral transmission, (Note: Bhikkhu Sujato & Bhikkhu Brahmali, p.4: "Most academic scholars of Early Buddhism cautiously affirm that it is possible that the EBTS contain some authentic sayings of the Buddha. We contend that this drastically understates the evidence. A sympathetic assessment of relevant evidence shows that it is very likely that the bulk of the sayings in the EBTS that are attributed to the Buddha were actually spoken by him. It is very unlikely that most of these sayings are inauthentic.) academic scholars have identified many of such inconsistencies, and tried to explain them. Information of the oldest teachings of Buddhism, such as on the Four Noble Truths, which are an important topic in the Dhammacakkappavattana Sutta, has been obtained by analysis of the oldest texts and these inconsistencies, and are a matter of ongoing discussion and research. (Note: According to Schmithausen, three positions held by scholars of Buddhism can be distinguished regarding the possibility to retain knowledge of the oldest Buddhism: 1. "Stress on the fundamental homogeneity and substantial authenticity of at least a considerable part of the Nikayic materials;" (Note: Well-known proponents of the first position are: * A.K. Warder. According to A.K. Warder, in his 1970 publication "Indian Buddhism", from the oldest extant texts a common kernel can be drawn out, namely the Bodhipakkhiyādhammā. According to Warder, c.q. his publisher: "This kernel of doctrine is presumably common Buddhism of the period before the great schisms of the fourth and third centuries BC. It may be substantially the Buddhism of the Buddha himself, although this cannot be proved: at any rate it is a Buddhism presupposed by the schools as existing about a hundred years after the parinirvana of the Buddha, and there is no evidence to suggest that it was formulated by anyone else than the Buddha and his immediate followers." * Richard Gombrich: "I have the greatest difficulty in accepting that the main edifice is not the work of a single genius. By "the main edifice" I mean the collections of the main body of sermons, the four Nikāyas, and of the main body of monastic rules."); 2. "Scepticism with regard to the possibility of retrieving the doctrine of earliest Buddhism;" (Note: A proponent of the second position is Ronald Davidson: "While most scholars agree that there was a rough body of sacred literature (disputed)(sic) that a relatively early community (disputed)(sic) maintained and transmitted, we have little confidence that much, if any, of surviving Buddhist scripture is actually the word of the historic Buddha."); 3. "Cautious optimism in this respect." (Note: Well-known proponents of the third position are: * J.W. de Jong: "It would be hypocritical to assert that nothing can be said about the doctrine of earliest Buddhism [...] the basic ideas of Buddhism found in the canonical writings could very well have been proclaimed by him [the Buddha], transmitted and developed by his disciples and, finally, codified in fixed formulas." * Johannes Bronkhorst: "This position is to be preferred to (ii) for purely methodological reasons: only those who seek may find, even if no success is guaranteed." * Donald Lopez: "The original teachings of the historical Buddha are extremely difficult, if not impossible, to recover or reconstruct."))

=== Development of the sutta ===
According to Bronkhorst this "first sermon" is recorded in several suttas, with important variations. (Note: The Dhammacakkappavattana Sutta is best-known from the Pāli Canon, Saṃyutta Nikāya chapter 56, sutta 11. In the Chinese Buddhist canon there are numerous editions of this sutra from a variety of different schools in ancient India, including the Sarvāstivāda, Dharmaguptaka, and Mahīśāsaka, as well as an edition translated as early as 170 by the early Parthian missionary An Shigao. Parallel texts can be found in other early Buddhist sources as well, such as the Sarvāstivādin Lalitavistara Sūtra and the Lokottaravādin Mahāvastu. (Note: Anandajoti (2010), "Introduction," retrieved 18 May 2010 from http://www.ancient-buddhist-texts.net/English-Texts/Earliest-Discourses/index.htm.)) In the Vinaya texts, and in the Dhammacakkappavattana Sutta which was influenced by the Vinaya texts, the four truths are included, and Kondañña is enlightened when the "vision of Dhamma" arises in him: "whatever is subject to origination is all subject to cessation." (Note: Translation Bhikkhu Bodhi (2000), Samyutta Nikaya, SN 56.11, p.1846. See also Anderson (2001), Pain and its Ending, p.69.) Yet, in the Ariyapariyesanā Sutta ("The Noble Search", Majjhima Nikāya 26) the four truths are not included, (Note: MN 26.17 merely says "[']This will serve for the striving of a clansman intent on striving.' And I sat down there thinking: 'This will serve for striving.' According to Bhikkhu Bodhi Majjhima Nikaya 36 then continuous with the extreme ascetic practices, which are omitted in MN 26. In verse 18, the Buddha has attained Nirvana, being secured from bondage by birth, ageing, sickness and death, referring to the truths of dependent origination and "the stilling of all formations, the relinquishing of all attachments, the destruction of craving, dispassion, cessation.") and the Buddha gives the five ascetics personal instructions in turn, two or three of them, while the others go out begging for food. The versions of the "first sermon" which include the four truths, such as the Dhammacakkappavattana Sutta, omit this instruction, showing that

...the accounts which include the Four Noble Truths had a completely different conception of the process of liberation than the one which includes the Four Dhyanas and the subsequent destruction of the intoxicants.

According to Bronkhorst, this indicates that the four truths were later added to earlier descriptions of liberation by practicing the four dhyanas, which originally was thought to be sufficient for the destruction of the arsavas. Anderson, following Norman, also thinks that the four truths originally were not part of this sutta, and were later added in some versions. (Note: According to Cousins, Anderson misunderstands Norman in this respect, but does "not think that this misunderstanding of Norman's position critically affects Anderson's thesis. Even if these arguments do not prove that the four truths are definitely a later insertion in the Dhammacakkapavattana-sutta, it is certainly possible to take the position that the sutta itself is relatively late.") According to Bronkhorst, the "twelve insights" are probably also a later addition, born out of unease with the substitution of the general term "prajna" for the more specific "four truths".

According to Bhikkhu Anālayo, there is no compelling basis for questioning the traditional account that the four truths were the topic of the Buddha’s first sermon, arguing that they are present in other, parallel versions of the sutra and the canon. He argues that the consistent presence of the Four Noble Truths across parallel versions supports their early and foundational role in early Buddhist doctrine. What remains uncertain, however, is how far these four truths were from the outset qualified as “noble.” (Note: Bronkhorst and Anderson follow Bareau, who argued in the 1960s that the four truths were not part of the Dhammacakkappavattana Sutta, as they were missing in important versions of it. His assessment has been questioned by Bhikkhu Anālayo, based on a comparative study and translation of a range of parallel versions of the Dhammacakkappavattana Sutta extant in Chinese. According to Analayo, the conclusion that the DS, accepted by him as "the first sermon", did not contain the four truths is erroneous, as it does not take into account extant parallels. Rhys-David noted in 1935 that the four truths are missing from the Fours in the Anguttara Nikaya. According to Analayo she overlooks the fact that discourses on this topic are instead allocated to the Sacca Saṃyutta of the Saṃyutta Nikāya. The Ariyapariyesanā Sutta (MN 26) narrates the Buddha's homeleaving and search, and his awakening. Anderson notes that the four truths are missing from this narrative, indicating that "the Ariyapariyesana-sutta shows that certain redactors of the canon conceived of the Buddha’s act of teaching without the four noble truths". According to Analayo, the expectation that the Ariyapariyesanā Sutta (MN 26) should give a full account of the Buddha’s teaching of the four noble truths is misplaced, as it is not a full-fledged biographical account, and has as its topic of the “noble search”, which does not require a complete coverage of the teaching given after this search was completed.)

=== The "essence" of Buddhism ===
According to Cousins, many scholars are of the view that "this discourse was identified as the first sermon of the Buddha only at a later date." According to Richard Gombrich,

Of course we do not really know what the Buddha said in his first sermon [...] and it has even been convincingly demonstrated (Note: Gombrich includes an end note here citing "Norman 1982".) that the language of the text as we have it is in the main a set of formulae, expressions which are by no means self-explanatory but refer to already established doctrines. Nevertheless, the compilers of the Canon put in the first sermon what they knew to be the very essence of the Buddha's Enlightenment.

Yet, the understanding of what exactly constituted this "very essence" also developed over time. What exactly was regarded as the central insight "varied along with what was considered most central to the teaching of the Buddha." "Liberating insight" came to be defined as "insight into the four truths," which is presented as the "liberating insight" which constituted the awakening, or "enlightenment" of the Buddha. When he understood these truths he was "enlightened" and liberated, (Note: "Enlightenment" is a typical western term, which bears its own, specific western connotations, meanings and interpretations.) as reflected in Majjhima Nikaya 26:42: "his taints are destroyed by his seeing with wisdom" - despite the fact that the four truths point to a gradual path of cultivation, and not to understanding the four truths as liberating in themselves. The four truths were superseded by pratityasamutpada (Pāli: paṭiccasamuppāda), and still later by the doctrine of the non-existence of a substantial self or person.

According to Anderson, a long recognized feature of the Theravada canon is that it lacks an "overarching and comprehensive structure of the path to nibbana." The sutras form a network or matrix, which have to be taken together. (Note: Gethin: "The word satya (Pali sacca) can certainly mean truth, but it might equally be rendered as 'real' or 'actual thing'. That is, we are not dealing here with propositional truths with which we must either agree or disagree, but with four 'true things' or 'realities' whose nature, we are told, the Buddha finally understood on the night of his awakening. [...] This is not to say that the Buddha's discourses do not contain theoretical statements of the nature of suffering, its cause, its cessation, and the path to its cessation, but these descriptions function not so much as dogmas of the Buddhist faith as a convenient conceptual framework for making sense of Buddhist thought.") Within this network, "the four noble truths are one doctrine among others and are not particularly central," but are a part of "the entire dhamma matrix." The four noble truths are set and learnt in that network, learning "how the various teachings intersect with each other," and refer to the various Buddhist techniques, which are all explicitly and implicitly part of the passages which refer to the four truths. According to Anderson,

There is no single way of understanding the teachings: one teaching may be used to explain another in one passage; the relationship may be reversed or altered in other talks.

== Translations into English ==
=== From the Pali version ===
In the Pāli Canon, this sutta is found in the Samyutta Nikaya, chapter 56 ("Saccasamyutta" or "Connected Discourses on the Truths"), sutta number 11 (and, thus, can be referenced as "SN 56.11"). There are multiple English translations of the Pali version of this sutta, including:

- Bhikkhu Bodhi (trans.), Setting in Motion the Wheel of the Dhamma
- Ñanamoli Thera (trans.) (1993). Dhammacakkappavattana Sutta: Setting Rolling the Wheel of Truth.
- Piyadassi Thera (trans.) (1999). Dhammacakkappavattana Sutta: Setting in Motion the Wheel of Truth.
- Thanissaro Bhikkhu (trans.) (1993). Dhammacakkappavattana Sutta: Setting the Wheel of Dhamma in Motion.
- Bhikkhu Sujato (trans.) (2018). Rolling Forth the Wheel of Dhamma.
- Thich Nhat Hanh (trans.) (1999). "Discourse on Turning the Wheel of the Dharma: Dhamma Cakka Pavattana Sutta". In The Heart of the Buddha's Teaching, p. 257.
- Ven. Dr. Rewata Dhamma (trans.) (1997). "The First Discourse of the Buddha: Turning the Wheel of Dhamma". In The First Discourse of the Buddha, Wisdom, pp. 17–20.
- Walpola Rahula (trans.) (2007). "Setting in Motion the Wheel of Truth". In What the Buddha Taught.

=== From Tibetan, Chinese and Sanskrit versions ===
- The Tibetan ‘Missing Translator’s Colophon’ Version of the Dharma Wheel Discourse (chos kyi ‘khor lo’i mdo ‘gyur byang med pa): A New Translation into English by Erick Tsiknopoulos (2013) This is a translation of one of two versions of the Dharma Wheel Sutra in Tibetan, known as the 'Missing Translator's Colophon' version (Tib: 'gyur byang med pa). It has a correlate in Chinese, translated into English by Lapiz Lazuli Texts and listed below.
- Lapis Lazuli Texts: Saṃyuktāgama 379. Turning the Dharma Wheel. This is a translation from the Chinese canon; the Chinese version is based on the Sarvastivadin Sanskrit version of the text (Dharmacakra Pravartana Sutra).
- Thich Nhat Hanh has produced a notable rendering of the first teaching of the Buddha in his biography of the Buddha entitled Old Path White Clouds. Thich Nhat Hanh relied on multiple sources for this rendering. This rendering is also included in Thich Nhat Hanh's book Path of Compassion: Stories from the Buddha's Life. See Turning the Wheel of Dharma

The 26th chapter of the Lalitavistara Sutra contains a Mahayana version of the first turning that closely parallels the Dhammacakkappavattana Sutta. The following English translations of this text are available:

- The Play in Full: Lalitavistara (2013), translated by the Dharmachakra Translation Committee. Translated from Tibetan into English and checked against the Sanskrit version. (Note: A Play in Full: Lalitavistara (2013), translated by the Dharmachakra Translation Committee)
- Voice of the Buddha: The Beauty of Compassion (1983), translated by Gwendolyn Bays, Dharma Publishing (two-volume set). This translation has been made from French into English and then checked with the original in Tibetan and Sanskrit.

== See also ==
- Anattalakkhaṇa Sutta
- Asalha Puja
- Buddha's Dispensation
- Enlightenment in Buddhism
- Four Noble Truths
- Middle Way
- Noble Eightfold Path
- Sarnath
- Taṇhā
- Three marks of existence

== Notes ==
Subnotes

== Sources ==
Printed sources

Pali Canon

- The Connected Discourses of the Buddha: A New Translation of the Samyutta Nikaya, translated by Bhikkhu, Bodhi, Boston: Wisdom Publications, 2000, ISBN 0-86171-331-1
- The Middle Length Discourses of the Buddha: A New Translation of the Majjhima Nikaya, translated by Bhikkhu Nanamoli, Boston: Wisdom Publications, 1995, ISBN 0-86171-072-X

Buddhist teachers

- Anandajoti Bhikkhu (trans.) (2010). The Earliest Recorded Discourses of the Buddha (from Lalitavistara, Mahākhandhaka & Mahāvastu). Kuala Lumpur: Sukhi Hotu. Also available on-line.
- Sumedho, Ajahn (2002), The Four Noble Truths, Amaravati Publications
- Sucitto, Ajahn (2010), Turning the Wheel of Truth: Commentary on the Buddha's First Teaching, Shambhala
- Dhamma, Ven. Dr. Rewata (1997), The First Discourse of the Buddha, Wisdom, ISBN 0-86171-104-1
- Geshe Tashi Tsering (2005), The Four Noble Truths: The Foundation of Buddhist Thought, Volume I (Kindle ed.), Wisdom
- Gethin, Rupert (1998), Foundations of Buddhism, Oxford University Press
- Goldstein, Joseph (2002), One Dharma: The Emerging Western Buddhism, HarperCollins
- Thich Nhat Hanh (1991), Old Path White Clouds, Parallax Press
- Thich Nhat Hanh (1999), The Heart of the Buddha's Teaching, Three River Press
- Thich Nhat Hanh (2012), Path of Compassion: Stories from the Buddha's Life, Parallax Press
- Rahula, Walpola (2007), What the Buddha Taught (Kindle ed.), Grove Press

Secondary

- Analayo (2012), "The Chinese Parallels to the Dhammacakkappavattana-sutta (1)" (PDF), Journal of the Oxford Centre for Buddhist Studies, 3: 12–46
- Analayo (2013), "The Chinese Parallels to the Dhammacakkappavattana-sutta (2)" (PDF), Journal of the Oxford Centre for Buddhist Studies, 5: 9–41
- Anderson, Carol (2001), Pain and Its Ending: The Four Noble Truths in the Theravada Buddhist Canon, Motilall Banarsidas
- Bronkhorst, Johannes (1993), The Two Traditions of Meditation in Ancient India, Motilal Banarsidass Publ.
- Cohen, Robert S. (2006), Beyond Enlightenment: Buddhism, Religion, Modernity, Routledge
- Cousins, L.S. (2001), "Review of Pain and its Ending: The Four Noble Truths in the Theravada Buddhist Canon" (PDF), Journal of Buddhist Ethics, 8: 36–41
- Davidson, Ronald M. (2003), Indian Esoteric Buddhism, Columbia University Press, ISBN 0-231-12618-2
- Gombrich, Richard (2002) [1988], Theravada Buddhism: A Social History from Ancient Benares to Modern Colombo, London: Routledge, ISBN 0-415-07585-8
- Gombrich, Richard F. (1997), How Buddhism Began: The Conditioned Genesis of the Early Teachings, Routledge, ISBN 978-1-134-19639-5
- Harvey, Peter (1990), Introduction to Buddhism, Cambridge University Press
- de Jong, J. W. (1993). "The Beginnings of Buddhism". The Eastern Buddhist. 26 (2): 11–30. ISSN 0012-8708. JSTOR 44361993.
- Lopez, Donald S. Jr. (1995), Buddhism in Practice (PDF), Princeton University Press, ISBN 0-691-04442-2
- Norman, K.R. (1982), "The Four Noble Truths: a problem of Pali syntax", in Hercus, L.A.; et al. (eds.), Indological and Buddhist Studies: Volume in Honour of Professor J.W. de Jong on his Sixtieth Birthday, Canberra: ANU Press, pp. 377–91
- Norman, K.R. (2003), "The Four Noble Truths" ( (PDF)), K.R. Norman Collected Papers II, archived from the original on 2020-01-01
- Schmithausen, Lambert (1981), On some Aspects of Descriptions or Theories of 'Liberating Insight' and 'Enlightenment' in Early Buddhism". In: Studien zum Jainismus und Buddhismus (Gedenkschrift für Ludwig Alsdorf), hrsg. von Klaus Bruhn und Albrecht Wezler, Wiesbaden
- Sharf, Robert H. (1995), "Buddhist Modernism and the Rhetoric of Meditative Experience" (PDF), NUMEN, 42 (3): 228–283, doi:10.1163/1568527952598549, hdl:2027.42/43810, archived from the original (PDF) on 2019-04-12
- Sharf, Robert H. (2000), "The Rhetoric of Experience and the Study of Religion" (PDF), Journal of Consciousness Studies, 7 (11–12): 267–87, archived from the original (PDF) on 2013-05-13
- Vetter, Tilmann (1988), The Ideas and Meditative Practices of Early Buddhism, BRILL
- Warder, A.K. (1999), Indian Buddhism (PDF), Delhi: Motilal Banarsidass – via Internet Archive

Web-sources
