= Buddhist-Christian Studies =

- Discipline: Religious studies
- Language: English
- Edited by: Thomas Cattoi and Kristin Johnston Largen

Publication details
- History: 1981–present
- Publisher: University of Hawaii Press (United States)
- Frequency: Annual

Standard abbreviations
- ISO 4: Buddh.-Christ. Stud.

Indexing
- ISSN: 0882-0945 (print); 1527-9472 (web)
- LCCN: 86645425
- JSTOR: 08820945
- OCLC no.: 42786144

Links
- Journal homepage; Online access

Buddhist-Christian Studies is an academic journal covering the historical and contemporary interrelationships between Buddhism and Christianity. It includes articles, conference reports, book reviews, and sections on comparative methodology and historical comparisons, as well as ongoing discussions from two dialogue conferences: the Theological Encounter with Buddhism, and the Japan Society for Buddhist–Christian Studies. Since 1987 it has served as the official journal of the Society for Buddhist-Christian Studies, a member of the Council of Societies for the Study of Religion.

Buddhist-Christian Studies appears annually before the November meeting of the American Academy of Religion. From 1987 through 1998 the cover listed contents in both Japanese and English. The first electronic edition appeared in 2000 on Project MUSE. Back volumes up to three years behind the current volume are available in the JSTOR electronic archive. The current editors are Thomas Cattoi and Kristin Johnston Largen.

== History ==
The journal was first published in 1981 by the East-West Religions Project at the University of Hawaii after it hosted a conference in Honolulu in June 1980. David W. Chappell (University of Hawaii) served as founding editor-in-chief, working with Roger Corless and other founding contributors. The University of Hawaii Press began distributing the journal in 1984 and became the publisher in 1988. In 1996, the editorship passed to Terry C. Muck and Rita M. Gross. In 2006, the editorship passed to Francis Tiso of the United States Conference of Catholic Bishops. In 2009, Mahinda Deegalle (Bath Spa University) became editor. In 2012, Wakoh Shannon Hickey began editing the journal. In 2013, she was joined by co-editor C. Denise Yarbrough.

== Abstracting and indexing ==
The journal is abstracted and indexed in the ATLA Religion Database, Asian Religious Studies Information, Religion Indexes, Religious and Theological Abstracts, SCImago Journal Rank, and Scopus.

== See also ==
- Buddhist Studies Review
- List of Buddhist universities and colleges
