= Buddhism and the body =

In contrast with many Indian religious traditions, Buddhism does not regard the body and the mind or spirit as being two entirely separate entities - there is no sense in Buddhism that the body is a "vessel" that is guided or inhabited by the mind or spirit. Rather, the body and mind combine and interact in a complex way to constitute an individual. Buddhist attitudes towards the body itself are complex, combining the distaste for sensual pleasure that characterizes the general Buddhist view towards desire with a recognition of both the individuals dependence on the body, and the utility of the body as an aide in the development of insight. Issues of gender, the mortification of the body, and the body as a source of troublesome desire are all addressed within the Buddhist scriptural tradition directly, while Buddhist attitudes towards other, more contemporary issues have continued to develop and change in response to the social and material changes in modern society.

== Historical and scriptural perspectives ==
=== Views ===
==== Place ====
The Buddhist tradition regards the body and the mind as being mutually dependent. The body or physical form (called Rūpa) is considered as one of the five skandha, the five interdependent components that constitute an individual. The Buddha taught that there is no separate, permanent, or unchanging self, and that a human being is an impermanent composite of interdependent physical, emotional and cognitive components. Identifying either the body or the mind as the self is dismissed as a mistaken view by the Buddha. In the Anatta-lakkhana Sutta, it is clearly stated that none of the five skandha should be regarded as the self.

Traditional sources often emphasize the attitude that the body should be subordinate to the mind; scriptures depict the Buddha instructing followers to look beyond physical discomfort and leave their minds undisturbed.

==== Revulsion ====
Though perhaps less concerned with issues of purity and pollution than the Brahmanist tradition, certain views of the body recorded in Buddhist scriptures do depict the body as unwholesome and potentially an object of disgust. This is the “unwantedness” of a body in the tradition of Buddhism identified by some scholars. Reflecting on the loathsomeness of the body is considered to be a particularly powerful method for countering attachment to sensual pleasures, such as sexuality or pride in appearance. Stories recorded in scriptures and in the biographies of Buddhist teachers particularly focus on the contemplation of the foulness of the female body as a remedy for sexual desire in a male religious practitioner.

==== Value ====
In contrast to views of the body as disgusting or a source of unworthy desire, the Buddhist tradition does speak of the value of the body in the context of the preciousness of human birth, and the value of a healthy body as an aid to pursuing the Buddhist path. While contemplating the repulsiveness of the body is considered to be a powerful remedy for sensual attachment, this is a therapeutic perspective that is not necessarily intended to be carried over into other areas of life. In particular, the suitability of the human body for the pursuit of religious practice is praised in traditional sources, comparing favorably with the capacities of birth among the gods or the various chthonic realms.

=== Meditation ===
Scriptures and meditation texts depict a number of meditation methods that focus particularly on the body. The passage of the breath through the body is particularly common. Entire sutras are devoted to contemplating breathing. Other meditations, used to counter attachment to sensuality, contemplate the frailty of the body - sickness, old age and death - to develop a sense of disgust with it. Analytic meditations - which break down the body into either its anatomical components or in terms of traditional elements - are intended to develop in the practitioner a knowledge of anatman, the Buddhist principle that no permanent enduring self exists within the individual.

=== Desire ===
"The engine for sex exemplifies ignorant craving quintessentially,”. Furthermore, “Sexual desire traps us; it renders us slaves to pleasure, slaves to our partners, slaves to the body itself. And it never brings satisfaction; rather, sex causes conflict, burns the mind, and brings us into bad company.” Sex can be seen as a primary reason of continuing samsara, after all, it did bring us into our discontented existence. Nonetheless, sex is not forbidden and Buddhists are aware that laymen and women will still have sex, so “A symbiotic relationship between the monastic order and lay adherents has characterized Buddhism from the beginning, with a dual sexual ethical track: Buddhism has traditionally held celibate monasticism in the highest regard, but it has also seen marriage and family life as highly suitable for those who cannot commit themselves to celibacy, and as an arena in which many worthwhile qualities are nurtured.” For the laypeople, some guidelines regarding normal, ethical sexual behavior can be found. For example, sex should only be between married couples, it should not be done on religious holidays or within the area of sacred shrines, and there are some examples of sexual misconduct, like oral and anal sex.

== Contemporary views ==
There are a number of issues relating to the body that, though given little attention in traditional Buddhist sources, have assumed significant importance in the modern world. Contemporary Buddhist views on these issues vary greatly between different cultures and individuals, and may combine the reinterpretation of traditional views with a variety of other influences.

=== Addiction ===
Buddhist scriptures talk a great deal about the general idea of attachment to sensual pleasures, but do not directly address the issue of substance addiction as it is understood in contemporary society. Jataka stories and certain rules governing lay and monastic behavior do discuss the use of alcohol and intoxicants.

=== Suicide ===
The issue of suicide can be difficult to address since the Buddha never stated what he thought about this topic. In Buddhism, suicide can be seen as an immoral act or it can be justified under certain circumstances. "The topic of suicide has been chosen not only for its intrinsic factual and historical interest but because it spotlights certain key issues in the field of Buddhist ethics and doctrine". This raises a lot of questions whether suicide is right or wrong in Buddhism or if the Buddha believed that suicide can be condoned. Some Buddhists may say that only the Enlightened can commit suicide. “(suicide) can be either right or wrong depending on the state of mind of the person who suicides: the presence of desire (or fear) makes it wrong, and the absence of desire (or fear) makes it right”. The story of Channa is one of the strongest stories, which question whether suicide can be justified.

“Channa was an unenlightened person (puthujjana) who, afflicted by the pain and distress of a serious illness, took his own life. This story however, raises a lot of questions whether the Buddha condoned suicide.” “Channa was not an arhat until the point of death those who suggests that suicide is wrong for a non-arhat would have to accept that Channa was wrong to commit the act”. It is said that there are some Buddhists who commit suicide and then become enlightened when they are about to kill themselves. The only person that can commit suicide is a bodhisattva. A bodhisattva might risk life and limb for the good of others.

To seek one's death or to make death one's aim (even when the motive is compassionate, directed toward reducing suffering) is to negate in the most fundamental way the values and final goal of Buddhism by destroying what the traditional sources call the “precious human life” we have the rare good fortune to obtain. It is also said that a person who commits suicide will simply be reborn with the additional bad karma of the suicide to contend with.
