= Tiso =

Tiso may refer to:

- Tiso (surname), a surname found in Slovakia, Italy and elsewhere
- Tiso (spider), a spider genus
