= Reality in Buddhism =

Buddhist system of natural laws which constitute the natural order of things

Reality in Buddhism is called dharma (Sanskrit) or dhamma (Pali). This word, which is foundational to the conceptual frameworks of the Indian religions, refers in Buddhism to the system of natural laws which constitute the natural order of things. Dharma is therefore reality as-it-is (yatha-bhuta). The teaching of Gautama Buddha constitutes a method by which people can come out of their condition of suffering through developing an awareness of reality (see mindfulness). Buddhism thus seeks to address any disparity between a person's view of reality and the actual state of things. This is called developing Right or Correct View (Pali: samma ditthi). Seeing reality as-it-is is thus an essential prerequisite to mental health and well-being according to Buddha's teaching.

Buddhism addresses deeply philosophical questions regarding the nature of reality. One of the fundamental teachings is that all the constituent forms (sankharas) that make up the universe are transient (Pali: anicca), arising and passing away, and therefore without concrete identity or ownership (atta). This lack of enduring ownership or identity (anatta) of phenomena has important consequences for the possibility of liberation from the conditions which give rise to suffering. This is explained in the doctrine of dependent origination.

One of the most discussed themes in Buddhism is that of the emptiness (sunyata) of form (Pali: rūpa), an important corollary of the transient and conditioned nature of phenomena. Reality is seen, ultimately, in Buddhism as a form of 'projection', resulting from the fruition (vipaka) of karmic seeds (sankharas). The precise nature of this 'illusion' that is the phenomenal universe is debated among different schools. For example;

- Some consider that the concept of the unreality of "reality" is confusing. They posit that the perceived reality is considered illusory not in the sense that reality is a fantasy or unreal, but that perceptions and preconditions mislead to believe that one is separate from the material. Reality, in this school of Buddhist thought, would be described as the manifestation of karma.
- Other schools of thought in Buddhism (e.g., Dzogchen), consider perceived reality literally unreal. As Chögyal Namkhai Norbu puts it: "In a real sense, all the visions that we see in our lifetime are like a big dream [...]". In this context, the term 'visions' denotes not only visual perceptions, but appearances perceived through all senses, including sounds, smells, tastes and tactile sensations, and operations on received mental objects.

== Reality in Buddhist scriptures ==
Buddhist sutras devote considerable space to the concept of reality, with each of two major doctrines—the Doctrine of Dependent Origination (pratitya-samutpada) and the Doctrine of Cause and Effect (karma and vipaka)—attempting to incorporate both the natural and the spiritual into its overall world view. Buddhist teachings continue to explore the nature of the world and our place in it.

The Buddha promoted experience over theorizing. According to Karel Werner in his text "Mysticism and Indian Spirituality",

Experience is ... the path most elaborated in early Buddhism. The doctrine on the other hand was kept low. The Buddha avoided doctrinal formulations concerning the final reality as much as possible in order to prevent his followers from resting content with minor achievements on the path in which the absence of the final experience could be substituted by conceptual understanding of the doctrine or by religious faith, a situation which sometimes occurs, in both varieties, in the context of Hindu systems of doctrine.

The Mahayana developed those statements he did make into an extensive, diverse set of sometimes contrasting descriptions of reality "as it really is." For example, in Tibetan Buddhism the Gelugpa draw a distinction between Svatantrika-Prasaṅgika in Madhyamika philosophy. This distinction was most prominently promulgated by Je Tsongkhapa (1357–1419 CE), when he argued that this distinction can be found explicitly and implicitly in the works of Nagarjuna, Chandrakirti, and Buddhapalita.

The Theravada school teaches that there is no universal personal god. The world does not have its origin in a primordial being such as brahman or the creator god. What is seen is only a product of transitory factors of existence, which depend functionally upon each other. The Buddha is said to have said: "The world exists because of causal actions, all things are produced by causal actions and all beings are governed and bound by causal actions. They are fixed like the rolling wheel of a cart, fixed by the pin of its axle shaft." (Sutta Nipata 654)

The word 'illusion' is frequently associated with Buddhism and the nature of reality. Some interpretations of Buddhism teach that reality is a coin with two sides: the not-permanent characteristic or anicca and the "not-self characteristic" or anatta, referred to as "emptiness" in some Mahayana schools. Dzogchen, as the non-dual culmination of the Nyingmapa (a sect with a few million followers out of a few hundred million Buddhists) of Mantrayana, resolves atman and anatman into the Mindstream Doctrine of Tapihritsa. The Buddha Shakyamuni is said to have taught the variously understood and interpreted concept of "not-self" in the Anatta-lakkhana Sutta. In this sutta, he lists the characteristics that are often associated with self identity, and found that these characteristics, ultimately, are not who an individual is because they are subject to change without control. He further illustrates the changing nature of feelings, perceptions, and consciousness.

The concepts of not-permanent and not-self in objective terms, for example by deconstructing the concept of an aggregated object such as a lotus and seeing that the flower is made up entirely of non-flower elements like soil, nutrients, photosynthetic energy, rain water and the effort of the entities that nourished and grew the flower. All of these factors, according to the Diamond Sutra, co-exist with each other to manifest what we call a 'flower'. In other words, there is no essence arisen from nothingness that is unique and personal to any being. In particular, there is neither a human soul that lives on beyond the death of the physical body nor one that is extinguished at death since, strictly speaking, there is nothing to extinguish. The relative reality (i.e., the illusory perceived reality) comes from our belief that human life is separate from the rest of the things in the universe and, at times, at odds with the processes of nature and other beings. The ultimate or absolute reality, in some schools of Buddhist thought, shows that we are inter-connected with all things. The concept of non-discrimination expands on this by saying that, while a chair is different from a flower, they 'inter-are' because they are each made of non-flower and non-chair elements. Ultimately those elements are the same, so the distinction between chair and flower is one of quantity not of quality.

The Diamond Sutra, a Mahayana scripture, has many passages that use the formula: A is not A, therefore A is called A.

== Reality and dreams in Dzogchen ==
In Dzogchen, perceived reality is considered to be illusion.

The real sky is (knowing) that samsara and nirvana are merely an illusory display.

— Mipham Rinpoche, Quintessential Instructions of Mind, p. 117

According to contemporary teacher Chögyal Namkhai Norbu, all appearances perceived during the whole life of an individual, through all senses, including sounds, smells, tastes and tactile sensations in their totality, are like a big dream. It is claimed that, on careful examination, the dream of life and regular nightly dreams are not very different, and that in their essential nature there is no difference between them.

The non-essential difference between the dreaming state and ordinary waking experience is that the latter is more concrete and linked to attachment; the dreaming experience while sleeping is slightly detached.

Also according to this teaching, there is a correspondence between the states of sleep and dream and our experiences when we die. After experiencing the intermediate state of bardo, an individual comes out of it, a new karmic illusion is created and another existence begins. This is how transmigration happens.

According to Dzogchen teachings, the energy of an individual is essentially without form and free from duality. However, karmic traces contained in the individual's mindstream give rise to two kinds of forms:

- forms that the individual experiences as his or her body, voice and mind
- forms that the individual experiences as an external environment.

What appears as a world of permanent external phenomena, is the energy of the individual him or herself. There is nothing completely external or separate from the individual. Everything that manifests in the individual's field of experience is a continuum. This is the 'Great Perfection' that is discovered in Dzogchen practice.

It is possible to do yogic practice such as Dream Yoga and Yoga Nidra whilst dreaming, sleeping and in other bardo states of trance. In this way the yogi can have a very strong experience and with this comes understanding of the dream-like nature of daily life. This is also very relevant to diminishing attachments, because they are based on strong beliefs that life's perceptions such as objects are real and as a consequence: important. If one really understands what Buddha Shakyamuni meant when he said that everything is (relatively) unreal, then one can diminish attachments and tensions.

The teacher advises that the realization that life is only a big dream can help us finally liberate ourselves from the chains of various emotions, different kinds of attachment and the chains of ego. Then we have the possibility of ultimately becoming enlightened.

Different schools and traditions in Tibetan Buddhism give different explanations of what is called "reality".

== Reality in the Tathagatagarbha Sutras ==
Prior to the period of the Tathagatagarbha Sutras, Mahayana metaphysics had been dominated by teachings on emptiness in the form of Madhyamaka philosophy. The language used by this approach is primarily negative, and the Tathagatagarbha genre of sutras can be seen as an attempt to state orthodox Buddhist teachings of dependent origination using positive language instead, to prevent people from being turned away from Buddhism by a false impression of nihilism. In these sutras the perfection of the wisdom of not-self is stated to be the true self; the ultimate goal of the path is then characterized using a range of positive language that had been used in Indian philosophy previously by essentialist philosophers, but which was now transmuted into a new Buddhist vocabulary to describe a being who has successfully completed the Buddhist path.

Contrasting with some forms of Buddhism, the Buddha's teaching on 'reality' in the Tathagatagarbha Mahayana scriptures - which the Buddha states constitute the ultimate manifestation of the Mahayana Dharma (other Mahayana sutras make similar claims about their own teachings) - insists that there truly is a sphere or realm of ultimate truth - not just a repetitious cycle of interconnected elements, each dependent on the others. That suffering-filled cycle of x-generating-y-and-y-generating-z-and-z-generating-a, etc., is Samsara, the prison-house of the reincarnating non-self; whereas liberation from dependency, enforced rebirth and bondage is nirvana or reality / spiritual essence (tattva / dharmata). This sphere also bears the name Tathagatagarbha (Buddha matrix). It is the deathless realm where dependent origination holds no sway, where non-self is supplanted by the everlasting, sovereign (aishvarya) self (atman) (as a trans-historical, unconditioned, ultimate, liberating, supra-worldly yet boundless and immanent awakened mind). Of this real truth, called nirvana - which, while salvationally infused into samsara, is not bound or imprisoned in it - the Buddha states in the Mahayana Mahaparinirvana Sutra:

"What is the Real (tattva)? Knowledge of the true attributes of Nirvana; the Tathagata, the Dharma, the Sangha, and the attributes of space ... is the Real. What is knowledge of the attributes of Nirvana? The attributes of Nirvana are eightfold. What are these eight? Cessation [of ignorance and suffering]; loveliness/ wholesomeness; Truth; Reality; Eternity, Bliss, the Self [atman], and complete Purity: that is Nirvana."

He further comments: " ... that which is endowed with the Eternal, Bliss, the Self, and Purity is stated to be the meaning of 'Real Truth' ... Moreover, the Real is the Tathagata [i.e., the Buddha]; the Tathagata is the Real ... The Tathagata is not conditioned and not tainted, but utterly blissful: this is the Real ...".

Thus, in such doctrines, a very positive goal is envisioned, which is said to lie beyond the grasp of the five senses and the ordinary, restless mind, and only attainable through direct meditative perception and when all inner pollutants (twisted modes of view, and all moral contaminants) are purged, and the inherently deathless, spotless, radiantly shining mind of Buddha stands revealed. This is the realm of the Buddha-dhatu (popularly known as buddha nature) - inconceivable, beginning-less, endless, omniscient truth, the Dharmakaya (quintessential body-and-mind) of the Buddha. This reality is empty of all falsehood, impermanence, ignorance, afflictions, and pain, but filled with enduring happiness, purity, knowingness (jnana), and omni-radiant loving-kindness (maitri).

== Vipassanā ==
Vipassanā (Pāli) or vipaśyanā (Sanskrit: विपश्यना) in the Buddhist tradition means insight into the true nature of reality. It is a practice of realizing our reality in order to see life as it is, in turn liberating ourselves like Lord Buddha.

== See also ==
- Anattalakkhaṇa Sutta
- Anunatva-Apurnatva-Nirdesa
- Anupubbikathā
- Bodhipakkhiyādhammā
- Buddha-nature
- Dependent Origination
- Four Noble Truths
- Guhyagarbhatantra
- Idealism
- Kalachakra
- Kleshas (Buddhism)
- Mahāparinibbāṇa Sutta
- Nirvana, the state of being free of illusion
- Noble Eightfold Path
- Reality and chakras in Bön
- Śūnyatā
- Tathagatagarbha
- Ten suchnesses
- Three marks of existence

== Notes ==
1. Sarvabuddhavishayavatarajñanalokalamkarasutra as cited by Elías Capriles: Clear Discrimination of Views Pointing at the Definitive Meaning. The Four Philosophical Schools of the Sutrayana Traditionally Taught in Tibet with Reference to the Dzogchen Teachings. Published on the Web.
