= Peter Harvey (academic) =

British writer and scholar of Buddhism (born 1951)

Brian Peter Harvey (born 1951) is a contemporary British scholar of Buddhism. He is professor emeritus of Buddhist Studies at the University of Sunderland.

== Career ==
Peter Harvey received his Ph.D. under the supervision of Ninian Smart at Lancaster University. Harvey is the author of An Introduction to Buddhism: Teachings, History and Practices published by Cambridge University Press, whose 1st edition sold over 55,000 copies. He has also authored a book on anatta, The Selfless Mind: Personality, Consciousness and Nirvana in Early Buddhism, and An Introduction to Buddhist Ethics: Foundations, Values and Practices published by the Cambridge University Press. His papers on Theravada Buddhism have appeared in many peer-reviewed journals, but his contributions to the broader Buddhist studies include an anthology of Theravāda, Mahāyāna and Vajrayāna texts that is being distributed by Mahachulalongkorn Rajavidyalaya University in Thailand. He co-founded UK Association for Buddhist Studies with professor Ian Harris, and has been an editor of the journal Buddhist Studies Review.

Harvey was Professor of Buddhist Studies at the University of Sunderland prior to his retirement.

== Family ==
As of 2013 Harvey was married with one daughter.
