= Aśvajit =

Arahant of Gautama Buddha

Venerable Assaji
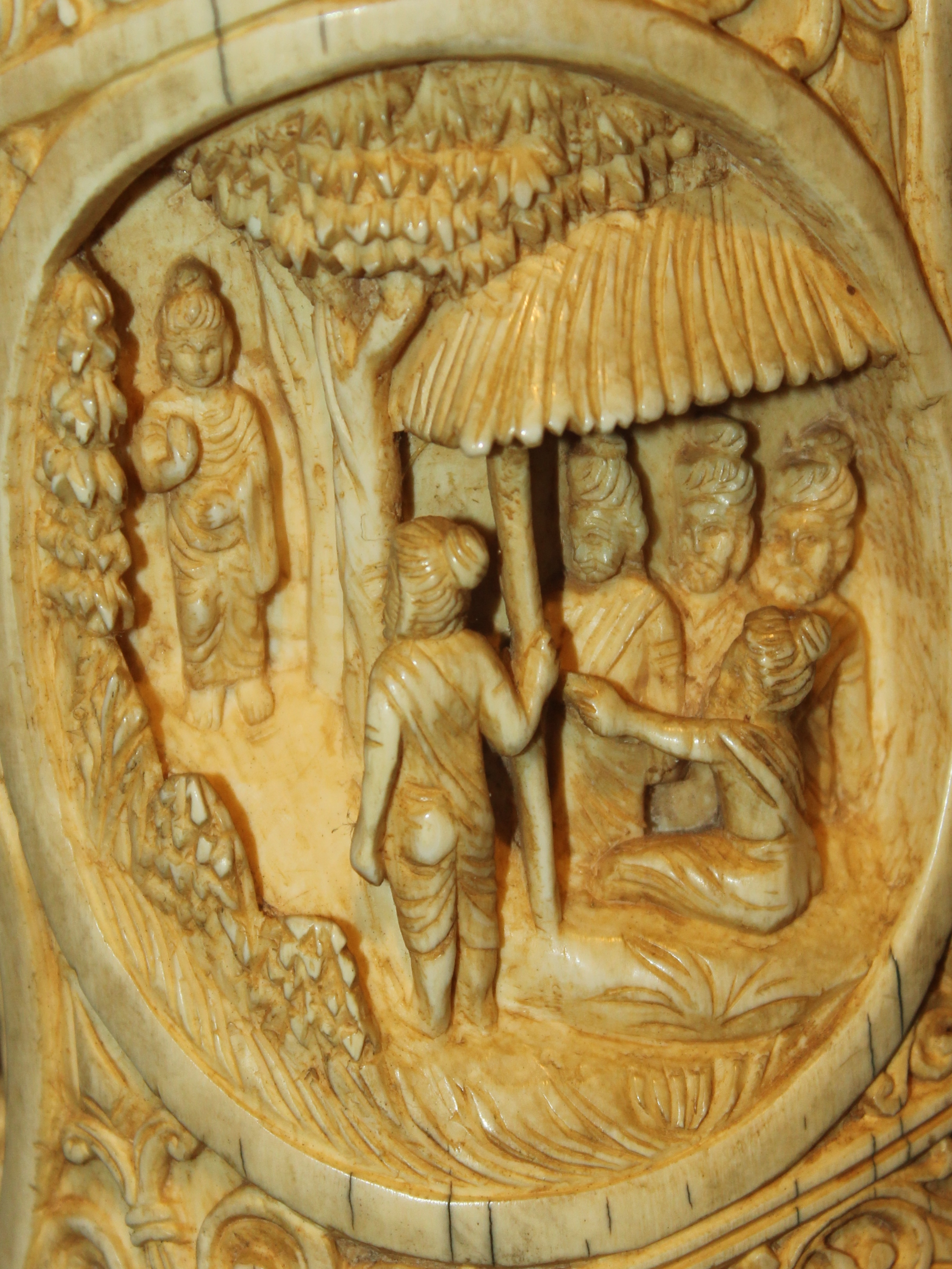
- Buddha preaches to Assaji and his four colleagues

Personal life
- Occupation: bhikkhu

Religious life
- Religion: Buddhism

Senior posting
- Teacher: Gautama Buddha

Aśvajit (Sanskrit: अश्वजित्; Pali: Assaji) was one of the first five arhants of Gautama Buddha. He is known for his conversion of Śāriputra and Maudgalyāyana, the Buddha's two chief male disciples, counterparts to the nuns Kṣemā and Utpalavarṇā, the chief female disciples. He lived in what is now Uttar Pradesh and Bihar in northern India, during the 6th century BCE.

== Background ==
Assaji was born into a scholar family. His father was one of the eight scholars who were invited by Suddhodana, the monarch of the Sakyan kingdom to Kapilavastu to read the fortune of his son Siddhartha. Assaji's father and six of the other had predicted that Siddhartha would either become a great religious leader or a great military monarch. Kaundinya, the youngest was the only one to confidently state that Siddhartha would become a Buddha. As a result, when Siddhartha renounced the world, Kondanna and Assaji, as well as Bhaddiya, Vappa and Mahanama, three sons of three of the scholars joined Siddhartha in the ascetic life. The five joined Siddhartha in self-mortification practices at Uruvela. When Siddhartha abandoned this practice to follow the Middle Way, they left him in disappointment, believing he had become indulgent.

== Arahantship ==
But after the Enlightenment, the Buddha visited them at Sarnath, where they had journeyed after the split. The Buddha preached the Four Noble Truths and the Dhammacakkappavattana Sutra, and they became the first five bhikkhus of the sangha. Assaji was the last to understand the teachings, and the Buddha had to give further explanations to him and Mahanama while the other three bhikkhus went out on alms round. He was the last to reach sotapanna, the first stage of arahanthood. He became an arahant, together with the others, at the preaching of the Anattalakkhana Sutra.

== Conversion of Sariputta and Mahamoggallana ==
Assaji was on alms round in Rajagaha, when Sariputta in his search for enlightenment, spotted him. Being impressed by Assaji's demeanour, Sariputta followed him until he had finished his alms round. After Assaji sat down, Sariputta asked him about his teacher and the teaching he followed. Initially, Assaji was reluctant to preach, explaining that he was inexperienced, but relented at the urging of Sariputta. Assaji spoke a short verse:

Of all those things that from a cause arise,

Tathagata the cause thereof has told;
And how they cease to be, that too he tells,

This is the teaching of the Great Recluse.

Sariputta comprehended, gaining sotapanna, the first stage of arahanthood after hearing the teachings, which implied the Four Noble Truths. He went off to tell Mahamoggallana, his friend since childhood that he had been successful in his search for enlightenment. Both then became bhikkhus in the sangha and went on to become the two chief disciples of the Buddha.

Assaji was highly venerated by Sariputta, and in whichever quarter Assaji was residing, Sariputta would extend his clasped hands in an attitude of reverent supplication in the direction, as well as turning his head when he lay down to sleep in the direction.

One day when Assaji was going through Vesali for alms, the Nigantha Saccaka, who was looking for ascetics to debate, questioned him regarding the Buddha's Dharma because Assaji was a prominent disciple (ñātaññatara-sāvaka). Assaji delivered a summary of the doctrine contained in the Anattalakkhana Sutta. Confident of his ability to refute these views, Saccaka went with a large concourse of Licchavis to the Buddha and questioned him. This was the occasion for the preaching of the Cula-Saccaka Sutta.

== See also ==
- Kaundinya
