= Tiso (surname) =

Tiso is a surname. Notable people with this name include:

- Jozef Tiso (1887–1947), president of fascist Slovakia in World War II
- Davide Tiso (born 1979), Italian musician
- Francis Tiso (born 1950), American Catholic scholar
- Paula Tiso (born 1963), American voice actress
- Štefan Tiso (1897–1959), Slovak lawyer
- Wagner Tiso (born 1945), Brazilian musician
