= Mahinda Deegalle =

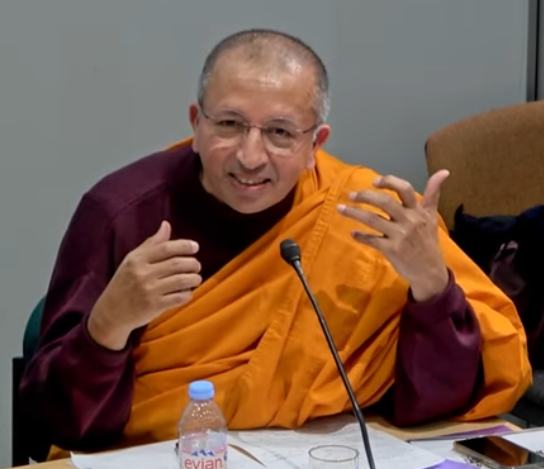
- In a discussion at SOAS in 2024
- Education: University of Peradeniya; Harvard University; University of Chicago
- Occupation: Academic
- Employer: Bath Spa University

Mahinda Deegalle is a scholar and writer who teaches at Bath Spa University. In 2000, he held the Numata Professorship in Buddhist Studies at McGill University. He writes both in Sinhala and English.

== Life ==
Deegalle is the author of Popularizing Buddhism: Preaching as Performance in Sri Lanka (State University of New York Press, 2006), the editor of Dharma to the UK: A Centennial Celebration of Buddhist Legacy (World Buddhist Foundation, 2008), Buddhism, Conflict and Violence in Modern Sri Lanka (Routledge, 2006), and the co-editor of Pali Buddhism (Curzon, 1996).

Deegalle attended the University of Peradeniya and obtained a B.A. Honours degree in Buddhist Studies. He studied Comparative Religion at Harvard University, where he obtained a Master of Arts in Theological Studies degree. He obtained a Ph.D. in History of Religions from the University of Chicago.

Deegalle serves in the Steering Committee of the Buddhism Section of the American Academy of Religion and of the managing committee of the Spalding Symposium on Indian Religions. He is the editor-in-chief of Buddhist-Christian Studies.
