= Roger Corless =

- At Coyote State Park
- Born: June 26, 1938; Merseyside, England
- Died: January 12, 2007 (aged 68); San Francisco, California
- Citizenship: American
- Education: Ph.D. (Buddhist Studies), University of Wisconsin–Madison, 1973
- Title: Professor of Religion; Duke University

Roger Corless (1938–2007) made significant contributions to interfaith dialogue, particularly on the subject Buddhist-Christian dual belonging ("co-inherent consciousness").

He was Professor of Religion at Duke University, and held visiting positions at the University of North Carolina at Chapel Hill, Stanford University, Chaminade University of Honolulu, California Institute of Integral Studies, University of California-Berkeley, and the Institute of Buddhist Studies.

== Biographical brief ==
Roger Corless studied at King's College London (B.D., 1961) and the University of Wisconsin–Madison (Ph.D., Buddhist Studies, 1973). His special interests were Pure Land Buddhism, Christian Spirituality, and Buddhist-Christian Dialogue.

He was a co-founder of the Society for Buddhist-Christian Studies and its journal Buddhist-Christian Studies (University of Hawaii Press).

He published four books, including The Vision of Buddhism, and more than sixty scholarly articles.

== Selected bibliography ==
Books

- The Art of Christian Alchemy: Transfiguring the Ordinary through Holistic Meditation. Paulist Press, 1981.
- I am Food: The Mass in Planetary Perspective. Wipf and Stock, 2004. Originally published by Crossroad, 1981.
- The Vision of Buddhism: The Space under the Tree. Paragon House, 1989.
- Buddhist Emptiness and Christian Trinity: Essays and Explorations. ed. with Paul F. Knitter. Paulist Press, 1990. (Contains his article “Can Emptiness Will?”)
- Where do we Go from Here? The Many Religions and the Next Step. Draft completed, publisher being sought.

Articles

- “An Essay on the Place of the Text in Buddhist and Christian Formation.” Studies in Formative Spirituality XIV:1 (February 1993), 31–40.
- “The Coming of the Dialogian: A Transpersonal Approach to Interreligious Dialogue.” Dialogue and Alliance: A Journal of the International Religious Foundation 7:2 (Fall/Winter 1993), 3–17.
- “A Form for Buddhist-Christian Co-Inherence Meditation” and “A Reply to the Responses”. Buddhist-Christian Studies 14 (1994), 139–144 and 181–184 (part of the forum on Joint Practice, pages 137–196).
- “A Buddhist Understanding of HIV/AIDS.” Religion in the Age of AIDS: Strategy and Theology from the AIDS & Religion in America Convention (San Francisco: Public Media Center; Washington DC: AIDS National Interfaith Network, 1999), pages 59–63.
- “Towards a Queer Dharmology of Sex.” Culture and Religion 5:2 (July 2004), 229–243.
