= Buddhist Studies Review =

- Discipline: Buddhist studies; Interdisciplinary
- Language: English
- Edited by: Naomi Appleton & Halle O'Neal

Publication details
- Former name: Pali Buddhist Review
- History: 1983–present
- Publisher: Equinox on behalf of the UK Association for Buddhist Studies (United Kingdom)
- Frequency: Biannually

Standard abbreviations
- ISO 4: Buddh. Stud. Rev.

Indexing
- ISSN: 0265-2897 (print); 1747-9681 (web)

Links
- Journal homepage

Buddhist Studies Review is a peer-reviewed academic journal published by Equinox.

The journal was founded in 1976 as Pali Buddhist Review by the Pali Buddhist Union, edited by Russell Webb. In 1983 it received its present name under the sponsorship of the Institut de recherche bouddhique Lin-So'n and the Pali Buddhist Union. in 1998 it was taken over by the UK Association for Buddhist Studies, and in 2006 Equinox began publishing it commercially.

== See also ==
- Buddhist-Christian Studies
