= Terry C. Muck =

- Professor
- Other post: Former Professor of World Religions at Asbury Theological Seminary

Personal details
- Born: Terry C. Muck; June 24, 1947 (age 79)
- Spouse: Frances S. Adeney

Terry C. Muck is a Christian scholar and academic. He has served as editor of Christianity Today, Dean of the E. Stanley Jones School of World Mission at Asbury Theological Seminary. In addition to a PhD. from Northwestern University, Muck holds a B.A. from Bethel College, an M.Div. from Bethel Theological Seminary, and an M.B.A. from National College of Education.

== Books ==
- With Harold A. Netland and Gerald R. McDermott, Handbook of Religion: A Christian Engagement with Traditions, Teachings, and Practices, Baker Academic, 2014, ISBN 978-0-80103776-4
