= Impermanence (Buddhism) =

Important doctrine of Buddhism

Translations of Impermanence
- English: Impermanence
- Sanskrit: अनित्य (IAST: anitya)
- Pali: अनिच्च (anicca)
- Burmese: အနိစ္စ (MLCTS: anicca)
- Chinese: 無常 (Pinyin: wúcháng)
- Japanese: 無常 (Rōmaji: mujō)
- Khmer: អនិច្ចំ (UNGEGN: ânĭchchâm)
- Korean: 무상 (RR: musang)
- Tagalog: anissa
- Tibetan: མི་རྟག་པ་ (Wylie: mi rtag pa, THL: mi tak pa)
- Thai: อนิจจัง (RTGS: anitchang)
- Vietnamese: vô thường

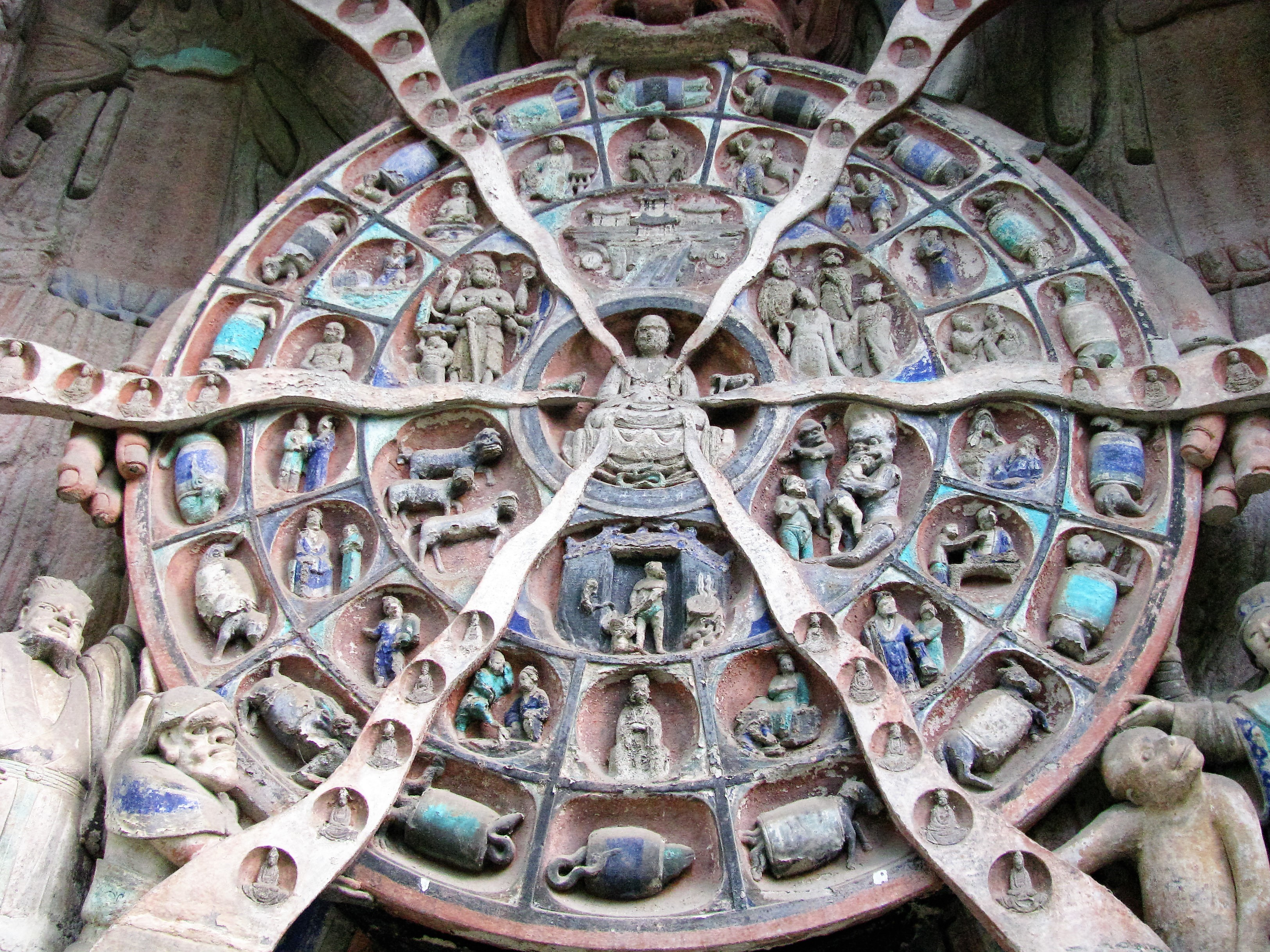
According to Buddhism, living beings go through many births. Buddhism does not teach the existence of a permanent, immutable soul. The birth of one form from another is part of a process of continuous change.

Impermanence, called Anicca in Pāli and anitya in Sanskrit, appears extensively in the Pali Canon as one of the essential doctrines of Buddhism. The doctrine asserts that all of conditioned existence, without exception, is "transient, evanescent, inconstant".

Anicca is one of the three marks of existence—the other two are Duḥkha (lit. "suffering", also rendered "dissatisfaction"; in context "unreliable", "precarity, instability, an unreliable place to stand";) and Anattā (the lack of a lasting essence).

Anicca is in contrast to Nibbana, the reality that is nicca, or knows no change, decay or death.

== In the marks of existence ==
Anicca is understood in Buddhism as the first of the three marks of existence (trilakshana), the other two being dukkha ('unease', from dushta, "standing unstable") and anattā (non-self, non-soul, no essence). It appears in Pali texts as, "sabbe saṅkhārā aniccā, sabbe saṅkharā dukkhā, sabbe dhammā anattā", which Szczurek translates as, "all conditioned things are impermanent, all conditioned things are painful, all dhammas are without Self".

Buddhism states that all physical and mental events come into being and dissolve. Human life embodies this flux in the aging process, the cycle of repeated birth and death (Samsara); nothing lasts, and everything decays. This is applicable to all beings and their environs, including beings who have been reborn in deva (god) and naraka (hell) realms.

Everything, whether physical or mental, is a formation (Saṅkhāra), has a dependent origination and is impermanent. It arises, changes and disappears. According to Buddhism, everything in human life, all objects, as well as all beings whether in heavenly, hellish or earthly realms in Buddhist cosmology, is always changing, inconstant, and undergoes rebirth and redeath (Samsara).

=== Association with anattā ===
Anicca is intimately associated with the doctrine of anattā, according to which things have no essence, permanent self, or unchanging soul. Understanding anicca and anattā are steps in the Buddhist's spiritual progress toward enlightenment.

=== Association with dukkha ===
Impermanence is a source of dukkha. The Buddha taught that because no physical or mental object is permanent, desires for or attachments to either causes suffering (dukkha).

Rupert Gethin on Four Noble Truths says:

As long as there is attachment to things that are
unstable, unreliable, changing and impermanent,
there will be suffering –
when they change, when they cease to be
what we want them to be.
(...)
If craving is the cause of suffering, then the cessation
of suffering will surely follow from 'the complete
fading away and ceasing of that very craving':
its abandoning, relinquishing, releasing, letting go.

== Anicca in everyday life ==
One of the most important aspects of anicca is its use in ordinary life. Many often react with panic, denial, or grief when facing change, whether a parent's illness, the end of a relationship, or even something small like a seat becoming uncomfortable. However, it becomes apparent that suffering from change usually is not about the change itself; rather, it is about clinging to what is pleasant and resisting loss. Using anicca in everyday life involves cultivating a different kind of awareness where instead of meeting change with resistance, one meets it with presence. Many people do not want to face the truth that they are too attached to pleasant things that they can enjoy through the senses, which do not truly bring happiness.

Psychologically, anicca promotes emotional balance and resilience, similar to the growth mindset described in modern-day psychology. The growth mindset refers to the understanding that challenges are opportunities for learning and transformation. By embracing the concept of anicca, one can observe the constant flow of change in bodies, emotions, relationships, and life without clinging to them. In this way, anicca becomes not only a philosophical truth but a practical guide for living with openness, motivation, and compassion in an ever-changing world. In the field of education, this understanding encourages both teachers and students to embrace learning as a dynamic process rather than a fixed outcome. When educators recognize that each learner's abilities and emotions are constantly evolving, they can approach teaching with greater patience and flexibility. Similarly, students who internalize impermanence are less likely to fear mistakes or setbacks, viewing them instead as temporary stages of growth. By integrating this awareness into classroom settings, anicca fosters a compassionate everyday learning environment where adaptability and continuous improvement are valued over perfection.

== See also ==
- Buddhist atomism and Mindstream
- Buddhist logico-epistemology

== Sources ==
- Gold, Jonathan C. (2023). "Pyrrho's Buddha on Duḥkha and the Liberation from Views". Journal of the American Academy of Religion, Volume 91, Issue 3, September 2023, Pages 655–679.
