= Francis Tiso =

Catholic priest who studies Tibetan Buddhism

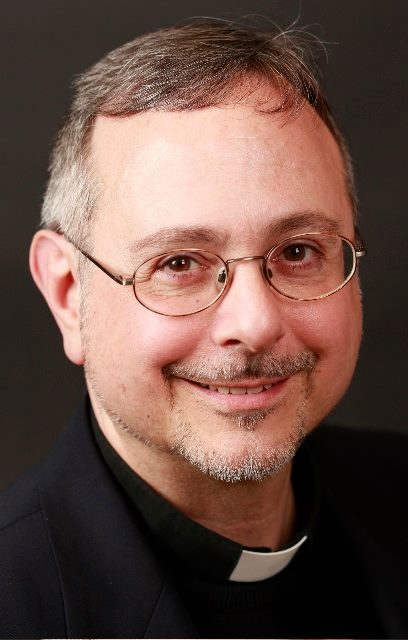
Francis Tiso

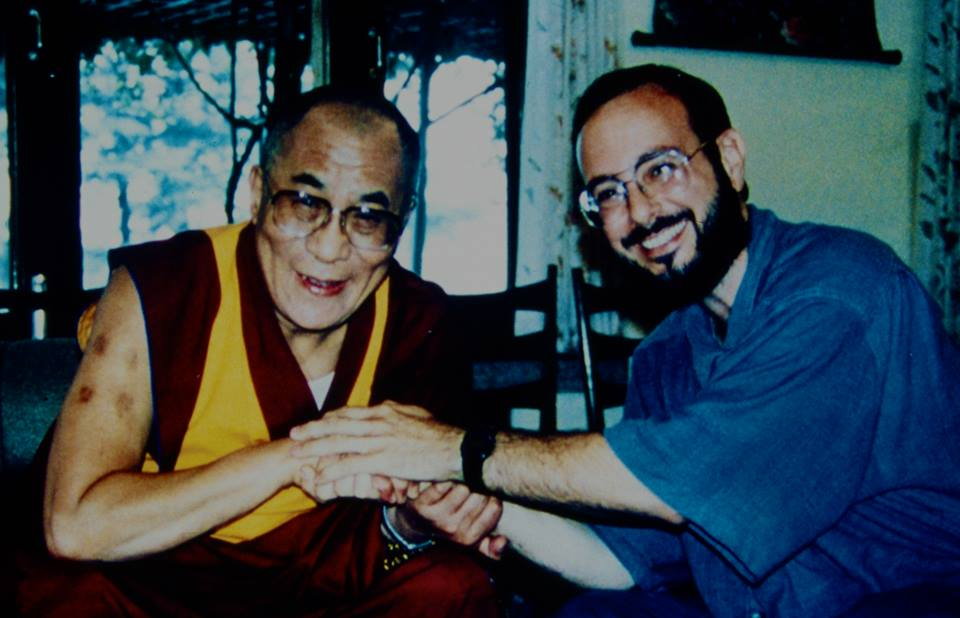
Francis Tiso with the 14th Dalai Lama.

Father Francis Vincent Tiso (born 19 September 1950) is a Catholic priest, scholar, and writer interested in inter-religious dialogue and Tibetan Buddhism. He teaches Tibetan Buddhism at the Pontifical Gregorian University (Universita' Pontificia Gregoriana: Istituto di Studi Interdisciplinari su Religioni e Culture) in Rome. He translated several early biographies of the Tibetan yogi and poet, Milarepa and studied the rainbow body phenomenon in Tibet. He has led research expeditions in South Asia, Tibet and the Far East, and his teaching interests include Christian theology, history of religions, spirituality, ecumenism and interreligious dialogue.

== Early life ==
Tiso was born in New York, and received an A.B. in medieval studies from Cornell University, a Master of Divinity degree (cum laude) at Harvard University and a doctorate from Columbia University and Union Theological Seminary where his specialization was Buddhist studies. He was assigned to the Archdiocese of San Francisco where he served as parochial vicar of St. Thomas More Church and chaplain at San Francisco State University and the University of California Medical School. He was also visiting professor in the archdiocesan School of Pastoral Leadership, where he taught courses in foundational theology. He also served as parochial vicar in Eureka, CA and in Mill Valley, CA.

== Interreligious dialogue ==
In 1995 Tiso was invited to accompany Cardinal Francis Arinze, then head of the Pontifical Council for Interreligious Dialogue, to a dialogue with Buddhist leaders in Taiwan. He has traveled extensively in India, Nepal, Tibet, Thailand, Japan, and Bangladesh. He was associate director of the Secretariat for Ecumenical and Interreligious Affairs of the US Conference of Catholic Bishops from 2004 to 2009, where he served as liaison to Islam, Hinduism, Buddhism, the Sikhs, and traditional religions as well as the reformed confessions.

== Pastoral activities in Italy ==
Since 1987 (diaconate), he has been a priest (ordained on May 19, 1988) of the Roman Catholic Diocese of Isernia-Venafro, Italy, where he served as pastor of the parish of St. Michael in Fornelli (IS) until 2015 and now as assistant pastor of the parish of St. Joseph in Isernia. He was Diocesan Delegate for Ecumenical and Inter-religious Affairs from 1990 to 1998 and rector of the Istituto Diocesano delle Scienze Religiose. He was also chaplain of the Hermitage of Saints Cosmas and Damian at Isernia from 1988 to 1998.

== Research and teaching ==
Tiso taught Tibetan Buddhism at the Pontifical Gregorian University in Rome and he was visiting lecturer at the University of Rome “La Sapienza”, Department of Oriental Studies. In 1984–85, he was teaching assistant, at Columbia University in New York. He is the recipient of grants from the American Academy of Religion, the American Philosophical Society, the Palmers Fund in Switzerland, and the Institute of Noetic Sciences in Petaluma, CA. In 2005-2008 he was editor of the Journal of the Society for Buddhist-Christian Studies. Francis Tiso is a musician and paints in acrylics and watercolors.

== Books ==
Rainbow Body and Resurrection: Spiritual Attainment, the Dissolution of the Material Body, and the Case of Khenpo A Chö. North Atlantic Books, 2016.

Liberation in One Lifetime: Biographies and Teachings of Milarepa. North Atlantic Books, 2014.

Liberation in One Lifetime: Biographies and Teachings of Milarepa. (Isernia: Pro Forma Designs: A Colle Croce Book, 2010)

"Muslim-Catholic Dialogues Sponsored by the United States Conference of Catholic Bishops" (Part I: December 2009; N.350; Second Part: January 2010, N. 351): Encounter: Documents for Muslim-Christian Understanding, Pontificio Istituto di Studi Arabi e d'Islamistica, Roma.

Supplement on line to The New Catholic Encyclopedia: "Buddhism" (with Charles Jones), 2010.

“Penance and Confession of Sins” in Encyclopedia of Women and World Religion, NY Macmillan Reference, 1998.

“Child Deities” in Encyclopedia of Women and World Religion, Macmillan Reference, 1998.

“The Voice of Milarepa: Redaction-critical Research on the Songs and Oral Teachings”. VIIIth international seminar of the IATS, Bloomington, IN, July 26, 1998.

(editor). The Sign Beyond All Signs: Christian Monasticism in Dialogue with India. (Asirvanam Monastery, Bangalore, 1997).

“Intervista di Vincenzo Piga con don Francis Tiso: Una risposta alla Congregazione per la Dottrina della Fede sulla Meditazione Cristiana”: Paramita, 1996.

“The Religion of Milarepa Before His Conversion,” in U. Bianchi, ed., The Notion of “Religion” in Comparative Research: Selected Proceedings of the XVI IAHR Congress (1990) Roma: “L’Erma” di Bretschneider, 1994.

“A Buddhist Classification of Reality: A Translation of the First Chapter of the Abhidharmakośa”, Abhidharma Research Institute No. 6 (1987).

Francis Tiso: A Young Person's Book of Catholic Signs and Symbols (NY: Doubleday, 1982).

“Love’s Conspirators: Builders of Earth-House-Hold,” J. Perlinski, ed. The Spirit of the Earth: A Teilhard Centennial Celebration (NY: The Seabury Press, 1982).

Francis Tiso and Br. David Steindl-Rast, O.S.B.: “Meditation”, Encyclopedia Americana, 1980.
