= Anattalakkhaṇa Sutta =

Second sermon preached by the Buddha in Sarnath

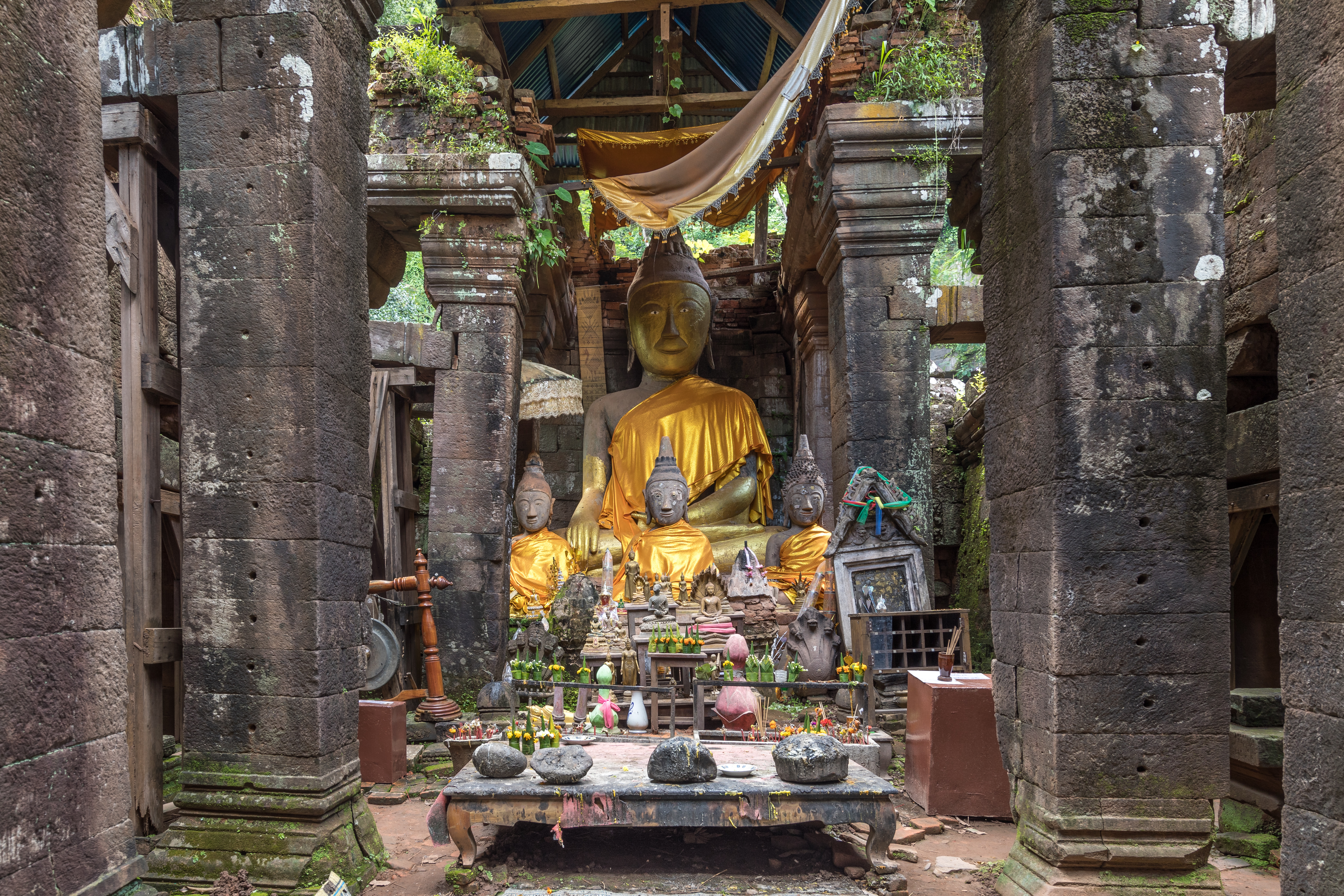
Lord Buddha

The Anattalakkhaṇa Sutta (Pali) or Anātmalakṣaṇa Sūtra (Sanskrit), is traditionally recorded as the second discourse delivered by Gautama Buddha. The title translates to the "Not-Self Characteristic Discourse", but is also known as the Pañcavaggiya Sutta (Pali) or Pañcavargīya Sūtra (Skt.), meaning the "Group of Five" Discourse.

== Contents ==
In this discourse, the Buddha analyzes the constituents of a person's body and mind (khandha) and demonstrates that they are each impermanent (anicca), subject to suffering (dukkha) and thus unfit for identification with a "self" (attan). The Pali version of this discourse reads:

"Form, ... feeling, ... perception, ... [mental] fabrications, ... consciousness is not self. If consciousness were the self, this consciousness would not lend itself to dis-ease. It would be possible [to say] with regard to consciousness, 'Let my consciousness be thus. Let my consciousness not be thus.' But precisely because consciousness is not self, consciousness lends itself to dis-ease. And it is not possible [to say] with regard to consciousness, 'Let my consciousness be thus. Let my consciousness not be thus.'...

"Thus, monks, any form, ... feeling, ... perception, ... fabrications, ... consciousness whatsoever that is past, future, or present; internal or external; blatant or subtle; common or sublime; far or near: every consciousness is to be seen as it actually is with right discernment as: 'This is not mine. This is not my self. This is not what I am.'

"Seeing thus, the well-instructed disciple of the noble ones grows disenchanted with form, disenchanted with feeling, disenchanted with perception, disenchanted with fabrications, disenchanted with consciousness. Disenchanted, he becomes dispassionate. Through dispassion, he is fully released. With full release, there is the knowledge, 'Fully released.' He discerns that 'Birth is ended, the holy life fulfilled, the task done. There is nothing further for this world.'"

== In Buddhist canons ==
In the Pali Canon, the Anattalakkhana Sutta is found in the Samyutta Nikāya ("Connected Collection," abbreviated as either "SN" or "S") and is designated by either "SN 21.59" (SLTP) or "SN 22.59" (CSCD and PTS), and its location in the PTS edition is given as "SN iii 66". This discourse is also found in the Buddhist monastic code (Vinaya).

In the Chinese set of Āgamas, this discourse can be found as Saṃyukta Āgama 34, or "SA 34". The Chinese version has been translated by Bhikkhu Anālayo. A version of this sutra is found among the Gāndhārī Buddhist Texts attributed to the Dharmaguptaka sect. The Gāndhārī version has been studied and edited by Mark Allon.

== See also ==
- Dhammacakkappavattana Sutta
- Anattā (Pali; Skt.: anātman; Eng.: "non-self")
- Three marks of existence: impermanence (anicca), suffering (dukkha) and non-self (anattā).
- Skandha (Skt.; Pali: khandha; Eng.: "aggregate") – Buddhist categories of body-mind constituents.
