= Anattā =

Buddhist doctrine of "non-self"

Translations of Anatta
- English: non-self
- Sanskrit: अनात्मन् (IAST: anātman)
- Chinese: 無我 (Pinyin: wúwǒ)
- Japanese: 無我 (Rōmaji: muga)
- Korean: 무아 (RR: mua)
- Tibetan: བདག་མེད་པ (bdag med)
- Vietnamese: vô ngã

In Buddhism, the term anattā (Pali: 𑀅𑀦𑀢𑁆𑀢𑀸) is the doctrine of "non-self" – that no unchanging, permanent self exists, and is the absence of essence in any phenomenon. It is sometimes interpreted as a strategy to attain non-attachment by recognizing everything as impermanent, and staying silent on the ultimate existence of an unchanging essence. However, orthodox Theravāda, as presented in the Visuddhimagga, asserts that “This is mere mentality-materiality, there is no being, no person.” It further states: “The mental and material are really here, but here there is no human being to be found, for it is void and merely fashioned like a doll—just suffering piled up like grass and sticks.”

In contrast, dominant schools of Hinduism assert the existence of Ātman as pure awareness or witness-consciousness, "reify[ing] consciousness as an eternal self".

== Etymology and nomenclature ==
Anattā is a composite Pali word consisting of an (not) and attā (self-existent essence). The term refers to the central Buddhist concept that there is no phenomenon that has a permanent, unchanging "self" or essence. It is one of the Three Marks of Existence, along with dukkha ("suffering, dissatisfaction") and anicca ("impermanence").

Anattā is synonymous with Anātman (an + ātman) in Sanskrit Buddhist texts. In some Pali texts, ātman of Vedic texts is also referred to with the term Attan, with the sense of "soul". An alternate use of Attan or Atta is "self, oneself, essence of a person", driven by the Vedic-era Brahmanical belief that the Atman is the permanent, unchangeable essence of a living being, or the true self.

In Buddhism-related English literature, Anattā is rendered as "not-Self", but this translation expresses an incomplete meaning, states Peter Harvey; a more complete rendering is "non-Self", meaning not an essential, permanent self or the possession of such a thing equivalent to "empty of Self or what belongs to Self". And to take anything as Self or "its" possession is a source of Dukkha (suffering, pain, unsatisfactoriness) when it changes. (Note: Buddha did not deny a being or a thing, referring it to be a collection of impermanent interdependent aggregates, but denied that there is a metaphysical self, soul or identity in anything.)

Buddhist scholar Richard Gombrich, however, argues that anattā is often mistranslated as meaning "not having a self or essence", but actually means "is not ātman" instead of "does not have ātman". It is also incorrect to translate Anattā simply as "ego-less", according to Peter Harvey, because the Indian concept of ātman and attā is different from the Freudian concept of ego. (Note: The term ahamkara is 'ego' in Indian philosophies.) Close to the Western idea of ego is the "'I am' conceit", the root of self-importance and self-centredness. This is seen as a delusion that only the enlightened lack.

== In early Buddhism ==
=== In early Buddhist texts ===
The concept of Anattā appears in numerous Sutras of the ancient Buddhist Nikāya texts (Pali canon). It appears, for example, as a noun in Samyutta Nikaya III.141, IV.49, V.345, in Sutta II.37 of Anguttara Nikaya, II.37–45 and II.80 of Patisambhidamagga, III.406 of Dhammapada. It also appears as an adjective, for example, in Samyutta Nikaya III.114, III.133, IV.28 and IV.130–166, in Sutta III.66 and V.86 of Vinaya. It is also found in the Dhammapada.

The ancient Buddhist texts discuss Attā or Attan (self), sometimes with alternate terms such as Atuman, Tuma, Puggala, Jiva, Satta, Pana and Nama-rupa, thereby providing the context for the Buddhist Anattā doctrine. Examples of such Attā contextual discussions are found in Digha Nikaya I.186–187, Samyutta Nikaya III.179 and IV.54, Vinaya I.14, Majjhima Nikaya I.138, III.19, and III.265–271 and Anguttara Nikaya I.284. According to Steven Collins, the inquiry of anattā and "denial of self" in the canonical Buddhist texts is "insisted on only in certain theoretical contexts", while they use the terms atta, purisa, puggala quite naturally and freely in various contexts. The elaboration of the anattā doctrine, along with identification of the words such as "puggala" as "permanent subject or soul" appears in later Buddhist literature.

According to Collins, the Suttas present the doctrine in three forms. First, they apply the "no-self, no-identity" investigation to all phenomena as well as any and all objects, yielding the idea that "all things are not-self" (sabbe dhamma anattā). Second, states Collins, the Suttas apply the doctrine to deny self of any person, treating conceit to be evident in any assertion of "this is mine, this I am, this is myself" (etam mamam eso 'ham asmi, eso me atta ti). Third, the Theravada texts apply the doctrine as a nominal reference, to identify examples of "self" and "not-self", respectively the Wrong view and the Right view; this third case of nominative usage is properly translated as "self" (as an identity) and is unrelated to "soul", states Collins. The first two usages incorporate the idea of soul.

=== No denial of self ===
Buddhist scholars Richard Gombrich and Alexander Wynne argue that the Buddha's descriptions of no-self in early Buddhist texts do not deny that there is a self. Wynne and Gombrich both argue that the Buddha's statements on anattā were originally a "not-self" teaching that developed into a "no-self" teaching in later Buddhist thought. According to Wynne, early Buddhist texts such as the Anattalakkhaṇa Sutta do not deny that there is a self, stating that the five aggregates that are described as not-self are not descriptions of a human being but descriptions of the human experience. According to Johannes Bronkhorst, it is possible that "original Buddhism did not deny the existence of the soul", even though a firm Buddhist tradition has maintained that the Buddha avoided talking about the soul or even denied its existence.

Tibetologist André Migot states that original Buddhism may not have taught a complete absence of self, pointing to evidence presented by Buddhist and Pali scholars Jean Przyluski and Caroline Rhys Davids that early Buddhism generally believed in a self, making Buddhist schools that admit an existence of a "self" not heretical, but conservative, adhering to ancient beliefs. While there may be ambivalence on the existence or non-existence of self in early Buddhist literature, Bronkhorst suggests that these texts clearly indicate that the Buddhist path of liberation consists not in seeking Atman-like self-knowledge, but in turning away from what might erroneously be regarded as the self. This is a reverse position to the Vedic traditions which recognized the knowledge of the self as "the principal means to achieving liberation."

According to Harvey, the contextual use of Attā in the Nikāyas is two-sided. In one, it directly denies that anything can be found called a self or soul in a human being that is a permanent essence of a human being, a theme found in Brahmanical traditions. In another, states Peter Harvey, such as at Samyutta Nikaya IV.286, the Sutta considers the materialistic concept in the pre-Buddhist Vedic period of "no afterlife, complete annihilation" at death to be a denial of Self, but still "tied up with belief in a Self". "Self exists" is a false premise, assert the early Buddhist texts. However, adds Peter Harvey, these texts do not admit the premise "Self does not exist" either because the wording presumes the concept of "Self" before denying it; instead, the early Buddhist texts use the concept of Anattā as the implicit premise.

=== Developing the self ===
According to Peter Harvey, while the Suttas criticize notions of an eternal, unchanging Self as baseless, they see an enlightened being as one whose empirical self is highly developed. This is paradoxical, states Harvey, in that "the Self-like nibbana state" is a mature self that knows "everything as Selfless". The "empirical self" is the citta (mind/heart, mindset, emotional nature), and the development of self in the Suttas is the development of this citta.

One with "great self", state the early Buddhist Suttas, has a mind which is neither at the mercy of outside stimuli nor its own moods, neither scattered nor diffused, but imbued with self-control, and self-contained towards the single goal of nibbana and a 'Self-like' state. This "great self" is not yet an Arahat, because he still does small evil action which leads to karmic fruition, but he has enough virtue that he does not experience this fruition in hell.

An Arahat, states Harvey, has a fully enlightened state of empirical self, one that lacks the "sense of both 'I am' and 'this I am'", which are illusions that the Arahat has transcended. The Buddhist thought and salvation theory emphasizes a development of self towards a Selfless state not only with respect to oneself, but recognizing the lack of relational essence and Self in others, wherein states Martijn van Zomeren, "self is an illusion".

=== Karma, rebirth and anattā ===
The four stages of awakening according to the Sutta Piṭaka
Outcome	Further rebirths	Abandoned fetters	
stream-enterer (sotāpanna)	up to seven, in earthly or heavenly realms	1. identity view 2. doubt in Buddha; 3. clinging to rites; and ritual	lower fetters
once-returner (sakadagami)	one more, as a human	1. identity view 2. doubt in Buddha; 3. clinging to rites; and ritual	lower fetters
non-returner (anāgāmi)	one more, in a pure abode	4. sensual desire 5. ill will	lower fetters
arahant	none	6. desire for; material rebirth 7. desire for immaterial rebirth 8. conceit 9. restlessness 10. ignorance	higher fetters

The Buddha emphasized both karma and anattā doctrines. The Buddha criticized the doctrine that posited an unchanging essence as a subject as the basis of rebirth and karmic moral responsibility, which he called "atthikavāda". He also criticized the materialistic doctrine that denied the existence of both soul and rebirth, and thereby denied karmic moral responsibility, which he calls "natthikavāda". Instead, the Buddha asserted that there is no essence, but there is rebirth for which karmic moral responsibility is a must. In the Buddha's framework of karma, right view and right actions are necessary for liberation.

Hinduism, Jainism and Buddhism all assert a belief in rebirth, and emphasize moral responsibility in a way different from pre-Buddhist materialistic schools of Indian philosophies. The materialistic schools of Indian philosophies, such as Charvaka, are called annihilationist schools because they posited that death is the end, there is no afterlife, no soul, no rebirth, no karma, and death is that state where a living being is completely annihilated, dissolved.

Damien Keown notes that the Buddha criticized the materialistic annihilationism view that denied rebirth and karma. According to the Buddha, such beliefs are inappropriate and dangerous because they encourage moral irresponsibility and material hedonism. Anattā does not mean there is no afterlife, no rebirth or no fruition of karma, where in fact Buddhism contrasts itself to annihilationist schools. Buddhism also contrasts itself to other Indian religions that champion moral responsibility but posit eternalism with their premise that within each human being there is an essence or eternal soul, and this soul is part of the nature of a living being, existence and metaphysical reality.

== In Theravada Buddhism ==
=== Traditional views ===
Theravada Buddhism scholars, states Oliver Leaman, consider the Anattā doctrine as one of the main theses of Buddhism. The Buddhist denial of an unchanging, permanent self is what distinguishes Buddhism from major religions of the world such as Christianity and Hinduism, giving it uniqueness, asserts the Theravada tradition. With the doctrine of Anattā the entire Buddhist structure stands or falls, asserts Nyanatiloka Mahathera.

According to Collins, "insight into the teaching of anattā is held to have two major loci in the intellectual and spiritual education of an individual" as s/he progresses along the Path. The first part of this insight is to avoid sakkayaditthi (Personality Belief), that is converting the "sense of I which is gained from introspection and the fact of physical individuality" into a theoretical belief in a self. "A belief in a (really) existing body" is considered a false belief and a part of the Ten Fetters that must be gradually lost. The second locus is the psychological realization of anattā, or loss of "pride or conceit". This, states Collins, is explained as the conceit of asmimana or "I am"; (...) what this "conceit" refers to is the fact that for the unenlightened, all experience and action must necessarily appear phenomenologically as happening to or originating from an "I". When a Buddhist gets more enlightened, this happening to or originating in an "I" or sakkayaditthi is less. The final attainment of enlightenment is the disappearance of this automatic but illusory "I".

The Theravada tradition has long considered the understanding and application of the Anattā doctrine to be a complex teaching, whose "personal, introjected application has always been thought to be possible only for the specialist, the practising monk". The tradition, states Collins, has "insisted fiercely on anattā as a doctrinal position", while in practice it may not play much of a role in the daily religious life of most Buddhists. The Theravada doctrine of Anattā, or not-self not-soul, inspire meditative practices for monks, states Donald Swearer, but for the lay Theravada Buddhists in Southeast Asia, the doctrines of kamma, rebirth and punna (merit) inspire a wide range of ritual practices and ethical behavior.

The Anattā doctrine is key to the concept of Nibbana in the Theravada tradition. The liberated nirvana state, states Collins, is the state of Anattā, a state that is neither universally applicable nor can be explained, but can be realized. (Note: This is a major difference between the Theravada Buddhists and different Hindu traditions which assert that nirvana is realizing and being in the state of self (soul, atman) and is universally applicable. However, both concur that this state is indescribable, cannot be explained, but can be realized.)

=== Current disputes ===
The dispute about "self" and "not-self" doctrines has continued throughout the history of Buddhism. In Thai Buddhism, for example, states Paul Williams, some modern era Buddhist scholars have claimed that "Nirvana is indeed the true self", while other Thai Buddhists disagree. For instance, the Dhammakaya tradition in Thailand teaches that it is erroneous to subsume nirvana under the rubric of anattā (no-self); instead, nirvana is taught to be the "true self" or dhammakaya. The Dhammakaya tradition teaching that nirvana is atta, or true self, was criticized as heretical in Buddhism in 1994 by Ven. Payutto, a well-known scholar monk, who stated that 'Buddha taught Nibbana as being no-self". The abbot of one major temple in the Dhammakaya tradition, Luang Por Sermchai of Wat Luang Por Sodh Dhammakayaram, argues that it tends to be scholars who hold the view of absolute no-self, rather than Buddhist meditation practitioners. He points to the experiences of prominent forest hermit monks such as Luang Pu Sodh and Ajahn Mun to support the notion of a "true self". Similar interpretations on the "true self" were put forth earlier by the 12th Supreme Patriarch of Thailand in 1939. According to Williams, the Supreme Patriarch's interpretation echoes the tathāgatagarbha sutras.

Several notable teachers of the Thai Forest Tradition have also described ideas in contrast to absolute no-self. Ajahn Maha Bua, a well known meditation master, described the citta (mind) as being an indestructible reality that does not fall under anattā. He has stated that not-self is merely a perception that is used to pry one away from infatuation with the concept of a self, and that once this infatuation is gone the idea of not-self must be dropped as well. American monk Thanissaro Bhikkhu of the Thai Forest Tradition describes the Buddha's statements on non-self as a path to awakening rather than a universal truth. Bhikkhu Bodhi authored a rejoinder to Thanissaro, agreeing that anattā is a strategy for awakening but stating that "The reason the teaching of anattā can serve as a strategy of liberation is precisely because it serves to rectify a misconception about the nature of being, hence an ontological error." Thanissaro Bhikkhu states that the Buddha intentionally set aside the question of whether or not there is a self as a useless question, and goes on to call the phrase "there is no self" the "granddaddy of fake Buddhist quotes". He adds that clinging to the idea that there is no self at all would actually prevent enlightenment. Thanissaro Bhikkhu points to the Ananda Sutta (SN 44.10), where the Buddha stays silent when asked whether there is a 'self' or not, as a major cause of the dispute.

== Anātman in Mahayana Buddhism ==
Anātman is one of the main bedrock doctrines of Buddhism, and its discussion is found in the later texts of all Buddhist traditions.

There are many different views of anātman (Chinese: 無我; pinyin: wúwǒ; Japanese: 無我 muga; Korean: 무아 mu-a) within various Mahayana schools.

The early Mahayana Buddhist texts link their discussion of "emptiness" (śūnyatā) to anātman and nirvana. They do so, states Mun-Keat Choong, in three ways: first, in the common sense of a monk's meditative state of emptiness; second, with the main sense of anātman or 'everything in the world is empty of self'; third, with the ultimate sense of Nirvana or realization of emptiness and thus an end to rebirth cycles of suffering. The anātman doctrine is another aspect of śūnyatā, its realization is the nature of the nirvana state and to an end to rebirths.

=== Nāgārjuna ===
The Buddhist philosopher Nāgārjuna (~200 CE), the founder of Madhyamaka (middle way) school of Mahayana Buddhism, analyzed dharma first as factors of experience. David Kalupahana states that Nāgārjuna analyzed how these experiences relate to "bondage and freedom, action and consequence", and thereafter analyzed the notion of personal self (ātman).

Nāgārjuna extensively wrote about rejecting the metaphysical entity called ātman (self, soul), asserting in chapter 18 of his Mūlamadhyamakakārikā that there is no such substantial entity and that "Buddha taught the doctrine of no-self".

Nāgārjuna asserted that the notion of a self is associated with the notion of one's own identity and corollary ideas of pride, selfishness and a sense of psychophysical personality. This is all false, and leads to bondage in his Madhyamaka thought. There can be no pride nor possessiveness, in someone who accepts anātman and denies "self" which is the sense of personal identity of oneself, others or anything, states Nāgārjuna. Further, all obsessions are avoided when a person accepts emptiness (śūnyatā). Nāgārjuna denied there is anything called a self-nature as well as other-nature, emphasizing true knowledge to be comprehending emptiness. Anyone who has not dissociated from their belief in personality in themselves or others, through the concept of self, is in a state of avidya (ignorance) and caught in the cycle of rebirths and redeaths.

=== Yogācāra ===
The texts attributed to the 5th-century Buddhist philosopher Vasubandhu of the Yogācāra school similarly discuss anātman as a fundamental premise of the Buddha. The Vasubandhu interpretations of no-self thesis were challenged by the 7th-century Buddhist scholar Candrakīrti, who then offered his own theories on its importance.

=== Tathāgatagarbha Sutras: Buddha is True Self ===
Some 1st-millennium CE Buddhist texts suggest concepts that have been controversial because they imply a "self-like" concept. In particular are the tathāgatagarbha sūtras, where the title itself means a garbha (womb, matrix, seed) containing Tathāgata (Buddha). These Sutras suggest, states Paul Williams, that "all sentient beings contain a Tathagata" as their "essence, core or essential inner nature". The tathāgatagarbha doctrine, at its earliest probably appeared about the later part of the 3rd century CE, and is verifiable in Chinese translations of 1st millennium CE. Most scholars consider the tathāgatagarbha doctrine of an "essential nature" in every living being is equivalent to "self", (Note: Wayman and Wayman have disagreed with this view, and they state that the tathāgatagarbha is neither self nor sentient being, nor soul, nor personality.) and it contradicts the anātman doctrines in a vast majority of Buddhist texts, leading scholars to posit that the tathāgatagarbha sutras were written to promote Buddhism to non-Buddhists.

The Mahayana Mahaparinirvana Sutra explicitly asserts that the Buddha used the term "self" in order to win over non-Buddhist ascetics. The Ratnagotravibhāga (also known as Uttaratantra), another text composed in the first half of 1st millennium CE and translated into Chinese in 511 CE, points out that the teaching of the tathāgatagarbha doctrine is intended to win sentient beings over to abandoning "self-love" (atma-sneha) – considered to be one of the defects by Buddhism. The 6th-century Chinese tathāgatagarbha translation states that "Buddha has shiwo (true self) which is beyond being and nonbeing". However, the Ratnagotravibhāga asserts that the "self" implied in tathāgatagarbha doctrine is actually "not-self".

According to some scholars, the Buddha-nature discussed in these sutras does not represent a substantial self; rather, it is a positive language and expression of śūnyatā "emptiness" and represents the potentiality to realize Buddhahood through Buddhist practices. Other scholars do in fact detect leanings towards monism in these tathagatagarbha references. Michael Zimmermann sees the notion of an unperishing and eternal self in the Tathagatagarbha Sutra. Zimmermann also avers that "the existence of an eternal, imperishable self, that is, buddhahood, is definitely the basic point of the Tathāgatagarbha Sutra". He further indicates that there is no evident interest found in this sutra in the idea of Emptiness (sunyata). Williams states that the "self" in tathāgatagarbha sutras is actually "non-self", and neither identical nor comparable to the Hindu concepts of brahman and self.

=== Vajrayāna ===
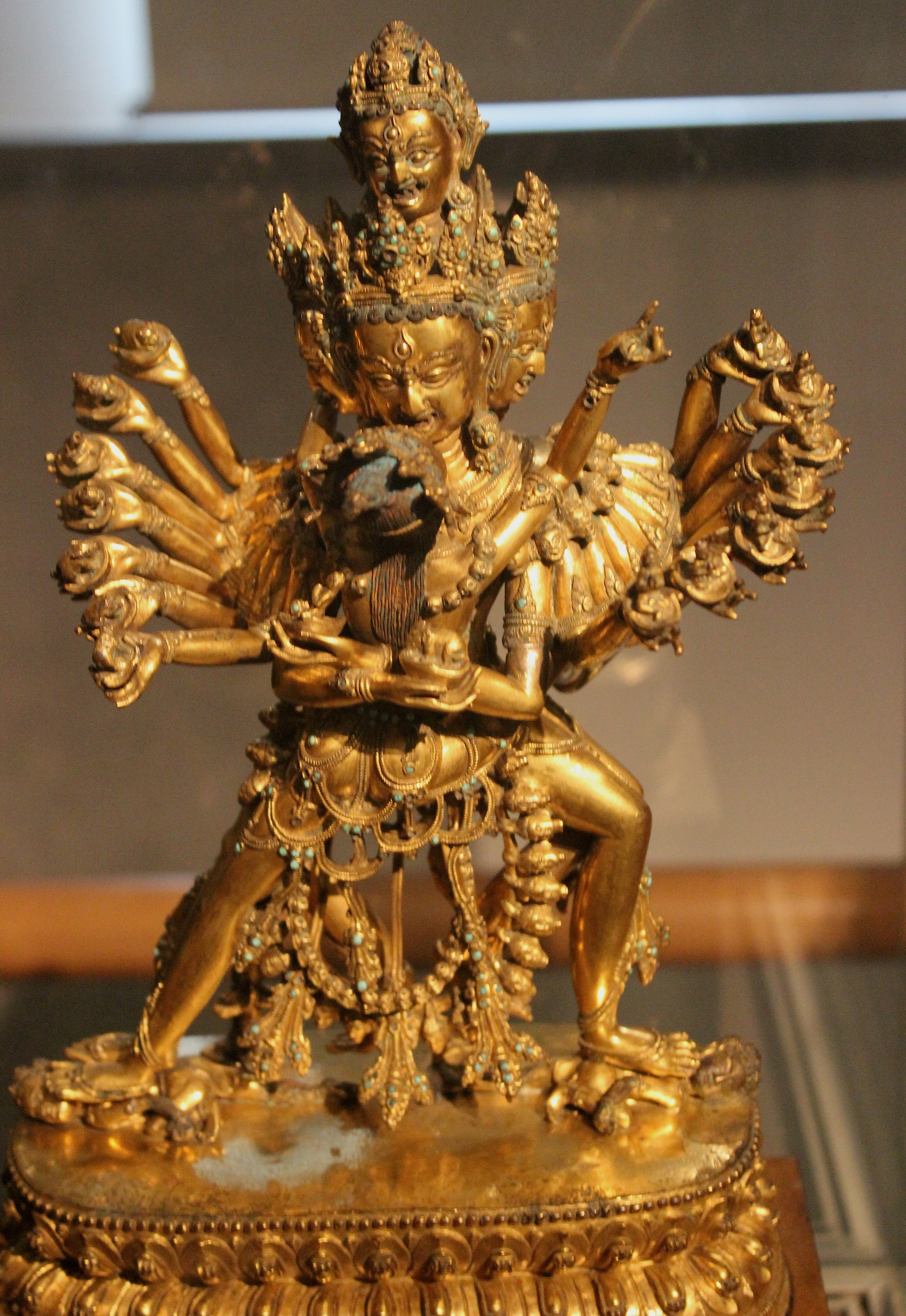
Tibetan and Nepalese Buddhist deities Nairatmya and Hevajra in an embrace. Nairatmya is the goddess of emptiness, and of anātman realization.

The anātman doctrine is extensively discussed in and partly inspires the ritual practices of the Vajrayāna tradition. The Tibetan terms such as bdag med refer to "without a self, insubstantial, anātman". These discussions, states Jeffrey Hopkins, assert the "non-existence of a permanent, unitary and independent self", and attribute these ideas to the Buddha.

The ritual practices in Vajrayāna Buddhism employs the concept of deities, to end self-grasping, and to manifest as a purified, enlightened deity as part of the Vajrayāna path to liberation from rebirths. One such deity is goddess Nairatmya (literally, non-soul, non-self). She symbolizes, states Miranda Shaw, that "self is an illusion" and "all beings and phenomenal appearances lack an abiding self or essence" in Vajrayāna Buddhism.

== Difference between Buddhism and Hinduism ==
=== Atman in Hinduism ===
The Buddhist concept of anattā or anātman is one of the fundamental differences between mainstream Buddhism and mainstream Hinduism, with the latter asserting that ātman ("self") exists.

In Hinduism, Atman refers to the essence of human beings, the observing pure awareness or witness-consciousness. It is unaffected by ego, distinct from the individual being (jivanatman) embedded in material reality, and characterized by Ahamkara ('I-making'), mind (citta, manas), and all the defiling kleshas (impurities). Embodied personality changes over time, while Atman doesn't.

According to Jayatilleke, the Upanishadic inquiry fails to find an empirical correlate of the assumed Atman, but nevertheless assumes its existence, and Advaitins "reify consciousness as an eternal self." In contrast, the Buddhist inquiry "is satisfied with the empirical investigation which shows that no such Atman exists because there is no evidence" states Jayatilleke. According to Harvey, in Buddhism the negation of temporal existents is applied even more rigorously than in the Upanishads:

While the Upanishads recognized many things as being not-Self, they felt that a real, true Self could be found. They held that when it was found, and known to be identical to Brahman, the basis of everything, this would bring liberation. In the Buddhist Suttas, though, literally everything is seen as non-Self, even Nirvana. When this is known, then liberation – Nirvana – is attained by total non-attachment. Thus both the Upanishads and the Buddhist Suttas see many things as not-Self, but the Suttas apply it, indeed non-Self, to everything.

Both Buddhism and Hinduism distinguish ego-related "I am, this is mine", from their respective abstract doctrines of "Anattā" and "Atman". This, states Peter Harvey, may have been an influence of Buddhism on Hinduism.

=== Anatman and Niratman ===
The term niratman appears in the Maitrayaniya Upanishad of Hinduism, such as in verses 6.20, 6.21 and 7.4. Niratman literally means "selfless". The niratman concept has been interpreted to be analogous to anatman of Buddhism. The ontological teachings, however, are different. In the Upanishad, states Thomas Wood, numerous positive and negative descriptions of various states – such as niratman and sarvasyatman (the self of all) – are used in Maitrayaniya Upanishad to explain the nondual concept of the "highest Self". According to Ramatirtha, states Paul Deussen, the niratman state discussion is referring to stopping the recognition of oneself as an individual soul, and reaching the awareness of universal soul or the metaphysical Brahman.

== Correspondence in Pyrrhonism ==
The Greek philosopher Pyrrho traveled to India as part of Alexander the Great's entourage where he was influenced by the Indian gymnosophists, which inspired him to create the philosophy of Pyrrhonism. Philologist Christopher Beckwith argues that Pyrrho based his philosophy on his translation of the three marks of existence into Greek, and that adiaphora (not logically differentiable, not clearly definable, negating Aristotle's use of "diaphora") reflects Pyrrho's understanding of the Buddhist concept of anattā.

== See also ==
- Ahamkara
- Anicca
- Asceticism
- Atman (Buddhism)
- Atman (Hinduism)
- Buddhist logico-epistemology
- Catuṣkoṭi
- Dukkha
- Ego death
- Enlightenment (religious)
- Jiva
- Nirvana
- Non-essentialism
- Mahāparinibbāṇa Sutta
- Mahaparinirvana Sutra
- Open individualism
- Philosophy of self
- Ship of Theseus – a related view in ancient Greek philosophy
- Skandhas
- Tathagatagarbha
- Teletransportation paradox
- Vertiginous question

== Sources ==
- Anderson, Carol (2013), Pain and Its Ending: The Four Noble Truths in the Theravada Buddhist Canon, Routledge
- Buswell, Robert E. Jr.; Lopez, Donald Jr. (2003), The Princeton Dictionary of Buddhism, Princeton University Press
- Carter, John Ross (1987), "Four Noble Truths", in Jones, Lindsay (ed.), MacMillan Encyclopedia of Religions, MacMillan
- Dalal, Roshen (2010). The religions of India : a concise guide to nine major faiths (Rev. ed.). New Delhi: Penguin Books. ISBN 978-0-14-341517-6.
- Dalai Lama (1997), Healing Anger: The Power of Patience from a Buddhist Perspective. Translated by Geshe Thupten Jinpa. Snow Lion Publications. Source: (accessed: Sunday March 25, 2007)
- Deutsch, Eliot (1973), Advaita Vedanta: A Philosophical Reconstruction, University of Hawaii Press
- Gombrich, Richard Francis (1988). Theravāda Buddhism: A Social History from Ancient Benares to Modern Colombo. Routledge. ISBN 978-0-415-07585-5. Archived from the original on 2016-12-22.
- Gombrich, Richard; Obeyesekere, Gananath (1988). Buddhism Transformed: Religious Change in Sri Lanka. Motilal Banarsidass. ISBN 978-81-208-0702-0. Archived from the original on 2019-12-24.
- Gombrich, Richard F. (1997). How Buddhism Began: The Conditioned Genesis of the Early Teachings. Routledge. ISBN 978-1-134-19639-5. Archived from the original on 2020-05-19.
- Gombrich, R. F. (1990). Recovering the Buddha's Message (PDF). Archived (PDF) from the original on 2012-04-26.
- Gombrich, Richard Francis (2009). What the Buddha thought. Equinox Pub. ISBN 9781845536145.
- Harvey, Graham (2016), Religions in Focus: New Approaches to Tradition and Contemporary Practices, Routledge
- Harvey, Peter (2013). An Introduction to Buddhism. Cambridge University Press.
- Harvey, Peter (2013b). The Selfless Mind: Personality, Consciousness and Nirvana in Early Buddhism. Routledge. pp. 34, 38. ISBN 978-1-136-78336-4. Archived from the original on 2016-09-01.
- Jayatilleke, K.N. (1963), Early Buddhist Theory of Knowledge (1st ed.), London: George Allen & Unwin Ltd., archived from the original (PDF) on 2018-12-24
- Keown, Damien (2000). Buddhism: A Very Short Introduction (Kindle ed.). Oxford University Press.
- Lopez, Donald S (1995). Buddhism in Practice (PDF). Princeton University Press. ISBN 0-691-04442-2.
- Lopez, Donald, jr. (2009), Buddhism and Science: A Guide for the Perplexed, University of Chicago Press
- Mackenzie, Matthew (2012). "Luminosity, Subjectivity, and Temporality: An Examination of Buddhist and Advaita views of Consciousness". In Kuznetsova, Irina; Ganeri, Jonardon; Ram-Prasad, Chakravarthi (eds.). Hindu and Buddhist Ideas in Dialogue: Self and No-Self. Routledge.
- Mackenzie, Rory (2007), New Buddhist Movements in Thailand: Towards an Understanding of Wat Phra Dhammakaya and Santi Asoke (PDF), Routledge, ISBN 978-1-134-13262-1, archived from the original (PDF) on 2020-10-22
- Makransky, John J. (1997), Buddhahood Embodied: Sources of Controversy in India and Tibet, SUNY
- McClelland, Norman C. (2010). Encyclopedia of reincarnation and karma. Jefferson, N.C.: McFarland. ISBN 978-0-7864-5675-8.
- K. R. Norman (1981), A Note on Attā in the Alagaddūpama Sutta Archived 2012-04-26 at the Wayback Machine. Studies in Indian Philosophy LD Series, 84 – 1981
- Plott, John C. (2000), Global History of Philosophy: The Axial Age, Volume 1, Motilal Banarsidass, ISBN 978-8120801585
- Raju, P. T. (1985). Structural Depths of Indian Thought. State University of New York Press. ISBN 978-0-88706-139-4.
- Reat, N. Ross (1994). Buddhism: A History. Jain Publishing. ISBN 978-0-87573-002-8. Archived from the original on 2019-12-21.
- Samuel, Geoffrey (2008), The Origins of Yoga and Tantra: Indic Religions to the Thirteenth Century, Cambridge University Press
- Seeger, Martin (2009), "Phra Payutto and Debates 'On the Very Idea of the Pali Canon' in Thai Buddhism", Buddhist Studies Review, 26 (1): 1–31, doi:10.1558/bsrv.v26i1.1
- Schmidt-Leukel, Perry (2006), Understanding Buddhism, Dunedin Academic Press, ISBN 978-1-903765-18-0, archived from the original on 2020-05-19
- Spiro, Melford E. (1982), Buddhism and Society: A Great Tradition and Its Burmese Vicissitudes, University of California Press
- Vetter, Tilmann (1988), The Ideas and Meditative Practices of Early Buddhism, BRILL
- Williams, Paul (2002), Buddhist Thought (Kindle ed.), Taylor & Francis
- Williams, Paul (2008), Mahayana Buddhism: The Doctrinal Foundations (PDF) (2 ed.), Routledge, ISBN 978-1-134-25056-1, archived from the original (PDF) on 2017-03-29
- Wynne, Alexander (2009). "Early Evidence for the 'no self' doctrine?" (PDF). Oxford Centre for Buddhist Studies: 59–63, 76–77. Archived (PDF) from the original on 2017-06-02.
- Wynn, Alexander (2010). "The atman and its negation". Journal of the International Association of Buddhist Studies. 33 (1–2): 103–171. Archived from the original on 2014-09-03.
