= Karma in Buddhism =

Action driven by intention which leads to future consequences

Translations of karma
- English: karma
- Sanskrit: कर्मन् (IAST: karman)
- Pali: 𑀓𑀫𑁆𑀫 (kamma)
- Bengali: কর্ম (kôrmô)
- Burmese: ကံ (MLCTS: kàɰ̃)
- Chinese: 業 or 业 (Pinyin: yè)
- Japanese: 業 or ごう (Rōmaji: gō)
- Khmer: កម្ម (UNGEGN: kâmm; ALA-LC: kamm; IPA: [kam])
- Korean: 업 or 業 (RR: uhb)
- Sinhala: කර්ම (karma)
- Tagalog: kalma
- Tibetan: ལས། (Wylie: las; THL: lé;)
- Thai: กรรม (RTGS: gam)
- Vietnamese: Nghiệp

Karma (Sanskrit: कर्म, Pāli: kamma) is a Sanskrit term that literally means "action" or "doing". In the Buddhist tradition, karma refers to action driven by intention (cetanā) which leads to future consequences. Those intentions are considered to be the determining factor in the form of rebirth a being takes in samsara, the repeating cycle of birth and death.

== Etymology ==
Karma (Sanskrit, also karman, Pāli: kamma, Tib. las) is a Sanskrit term that literally means "action" or "doing". The word karma derives from the verbal root kṛ, which means "do, make, perform, accomplish."

Karmaphala (Tib. rgyu 'bras (Note: In common Tibetan common speech, the term las, "karma", is often used to denote the entire process of karma-and-fruit.)) is the "fruit", "effect" or "result" of karma. A similar term is karmavipaka, the "maturation" or "cooking" of karma:

The remote effects of karmic choices are referred to as the 'maturation' (vipāka) or 'fruit' (phala) of the karmic act."

The metaphor is derived from agriculture:

One sows a seed, there is a time lag during which some mysterious invisible process takes place, and then the plant pops up and can be harvested.

== Buddhist understanding of karma ==
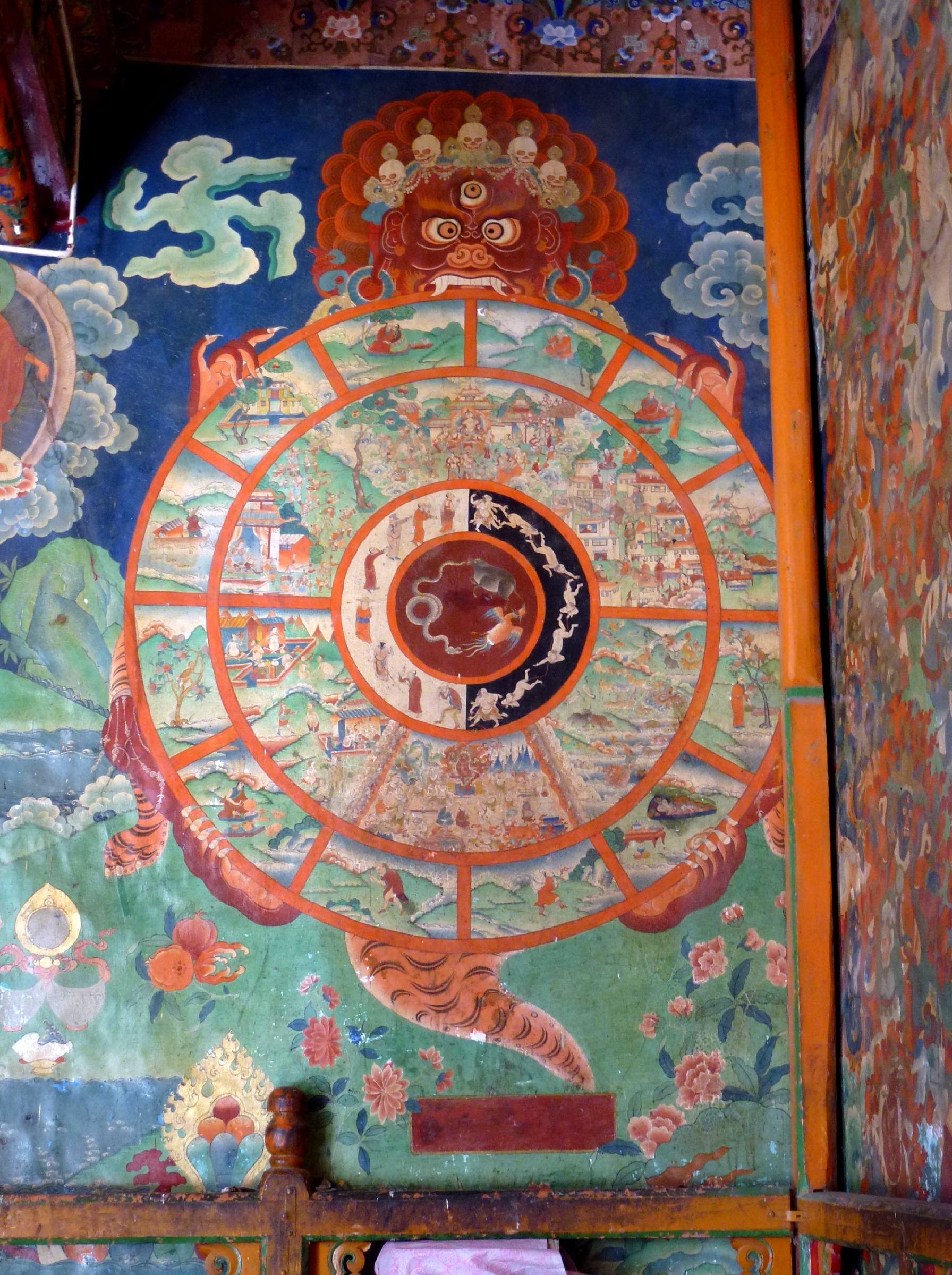
Tibetan Bhavacakra or "Wheel of Life" in Sera, Lhasa.

Karma and karmaphala are fundamental concepts in Buddhism. The concepts of karma and karmaphala explain how intentional actions keep one tied to rebirth in samsara, whereas the Buddhist path, as exemplified in the Noble Eightfold Path, shows us the way out of samsara.

=== Rebirth ===
Rebirth, (Note: Sanskrit, punaraāvŗtti, punarutpatti, punarjanman, or punarjīlvātu), is a common belief in all Buddhist traditions. It says that birth and death in the six realms occur in successive cycles driven by ignorance (avidyā), desire (trsnā), and hatred (dvesa). The cycle of rebirth is called samsāra. It is a beginningless and ever-ongoing process. Liberation from samsāra can be attained by following the Buddhist Path. This path leads to vidyā (knowledge), and the stilling of trsnā and dvesa. Hereby the ongoing process of rebirth is stopped.

=== Karma ===
The cycle of rebirth is determined by karma, literally "action". (Note: In early Buddhism rebirth is ascribed to craving or ignorance, and the theory of karma may have been of minor importance in early Buddhist soteriology.) In the Buddhist tradition, karma refers to actions driven by intention (cetanā), (Note: Rupert Gethin: "[Karma is] a being's intentional 'actions' of body, speech, and mind—whatever is done, said, or even just thought with definite intention or volition"; "[a]t root karma or 'action' is considered a mental act or intention; it is an aspect of our mental life: 'It is "intention" that I call karma; having formed the intention, one performs acts (karma) by body, speech and mind.'") a deed done deliberately through body, speech or mind, which leads to future consequences. The Nibbedhika Sutta, Anguttara Nikaya 6.63:

Intention (cetana) I tell you, is kamma. Intending, one does kamma by way of body, speech, & intellect. (Note: Thanissaro Bhikkhu, trans. (1997). Nibbedhika Sutta: Penetrative, AN 6.63, PTS: A iii 410) (Note: There are many different translation of the above quote into English. For example, Peter Harvey translates the quote as follows: "It is will (cetana), O monks, that I call karma; having willed, one acts through body, speech, and mind." (A.III.415).)

According to Peter Harvey,

It is the psychological impulse behind an action that is 'karma', that which sets going a chain of causes culminating in karmic fruit. Actions, then, must be intentional if they are to generate karmic fruits.

And according to Gombrich,

The Buddha defined karma as intention; whether the intention manifested itself in physical, vocal or mental form, it was the intention alone which had a moral character: good, bad or neutral [...] The focus of interest shifted from physical action, involving people and objects in the real world, to psychological process.

According to Gombrich, this was a great innovation, which overturns brahmanical, caste-bound ethics. It is a rejection of caste-bound differences, giving the same possibility to reach liberation to all people, not just Brahmanins:

Not by birth is one a brahmin or an outcaste, but by deeds (kamma). (Note: Sutta-nipata verse 1366)

How this emphasis on intention was to be interpreted became a matter of debate in and between the various Buddhist schools. (Note: For example, the Sautrāntika, a subsect of the Sarvastivada, the most important of the early Buddhist schools, regarded the intention to be the stimulus for karma, action which leads to consequences. The Vaibhāṣika, the other sub-sect of the Sarvastivada, separated the intention from the act, regarding intention as karma proper. (Note: Gombrich: "Bodily and verbal action manifested one's intention to others and therefore were called vijñapti, 'information'."))

=== Karmaphala ===
Karma leads to future consequences, karma-phala, "fruit of action". Any given action may cause all sorts of results, but the karmic results are only those results which are a consequence of both the moral quality of the action, and of the intention behind the action. (Note: In the Abhidharma they are referred to by specific names for the sake of clarity, karmic causes being the "cause of results" (S. vipāka-hetu) and the karmic results being the "resultant fruit" (S. vipāka-phala).) According to Reichenbach,

[T]he consequences envisioned by the law of karma encompass more (as well as less) than the observed natural or physical results which follow upon the performance of an action.

The "law of karma" applies

...specifically to the moral sphere[.] [It is] not concerned with the general relation between actions and their consequences, but rather with the moral quality of actions and their consequences, such as the pain and pleasure and good or bad experiences for the doer of the act.

Good moral actions lead to wholesome rebirths, and bad moral actions lead to unwholesome rebirths. (Note: Karma and samsara: Peter Harvey: "The movement of beings between rebirths is not a haphazard process but is ordered and governed by the law of karma, the principle that beings are reborn according to the nature and quality of their past actions; they are 'heir' to their actions (M.III.123)."; Damien Keown: "In the cosmology [of the realms of existence], karma functions as the elevator that takes people from one floor of the building to another. Good deeds result in an upward movement and bad deeds in a downward one. Karma is not a system of rewards and punishments meted out by God but a kind of natural law akin to the law of gravity. Individuals are thus the sole authors of their good and bad fortune."; Alexander Berzin: "In short, the external and internal cycles of time delineate samsara – uncontrollably recurring rebirth, fraught with problems and difficulties. These cycles are driven by impulses of energy, known in the Kalachakra system as "winds of karma." Karma is a force intimately connected with mind and arises due to confusion about reality." (Note: Alexander Berzin, Overview of Kalachakra); Paul Williams: "All rebirth is due to karman and is impermanent. Short of attaining enlightenment, in each rebirth one is born and dies, to be reborn elsewhere in accordance with the completely impersonal causal nature of one's own karman. The endless cycle of birth, rebirth, and redeath, is samsara.") (Note: Wholesome and unwholesome actions: Ringu Tulku: "We create [karmic results] in three different ways, through actions that are positive, negative, or neutral. When we feel kindness and love and with this attitude do good things, which are beneficial to both ourselves and others, this is positive action. When we commit harmful deeds out of equally harmful intentions, this is negative action. Finally, when our motivation is indifferent and our deeds are neither harmful or beneficial, this is neutral action. The results we experience will accord with the quality of our actions."; Gethin: [R]ebirth in the lower realms is considered to be the result of relatively unwholesome (akuśala/akusala), or bad (pāpa) karma, while rebirth in the higher realms the result of relatively wholesome (kuśala/kusala), or good (puṇya/puñña) karma.) The main factor is how they contribute to the well-being of others in a positive or negative sense. Especially dāna, giving to the Buddhist order, became an increasingly important source of positive karma.

How these intentional actions lead to rebirth, and how the idea of rebirth is to be reconciled with the doctrines of impermanence and no-self, (Note: Dargray: "When [the Buddhist] understanding of karma is correlated to the Buddhist doctrine of universal impermanence and No-Self, a serious problem arises as to where this trace is stored and what the trace left is. The problem is aggravated when the trace remains latent over a long period, perhaps over a period of many existences. The crucial problem presented to all schools of Buddhist philosophy was where the trace is stored and how it can remain in the ever-changing stream of phenomena which build up the individual and what the nature of this trace is.") is a matter of philosophical inquiry in the Buddhist traditions, for which several solutions have been proposed. In early Buddhism no explicit theory of rebirth and karma is worked out, and "the karma doctrine may have been incidental to early Buddhist soteriology." In early Buddhism, rebirth is ascribed to craving or ignorance.

In later Buddhism, the basic idea is that intentional actions, driven by kleshas ("disturbing emotions"), (Note: Thubten Chodron (1993). The Twelve Links – Part 2 of 5 (PDF)) cetanā ("volition"), or taṇhā ("thirst", "craving") create impressions, (Note: See also Saṅkhāra) tendencies or "seeds" in the mind. These impressions, or "seeds", will ripen into a future result or fruition. (Note: Seed and fruit: Peter Harvey: "Karma is often likened to a seed, and the two words for karmic result, vipaka and phala, respectively mean 'ripening' and 'fruit'. An action is thus like a seed which will sooner or later, as part of its natural maturation process, result in certain fruits accruing to the doer of the action."; Ken McLeod: "Karma, then, describes how our actions evolve into experience, internally and externally. Each action is a seed which grows or evolves into our experience of the world. Every action either starts a new growth process or reinforces an old one as described by the four results. (Note: In the Tibetan tradition, a karmic action grows into four results: the result of full ripening, the result from what happened, the result from what acted, and the environmental result.) (Note: What is Karma? p.2 Archived 2014-02-02 at the Wayback Machine, Ken McLeod)) (Note: For bīja, see also Yogacara#Karma, seeds and storehouse-consciousness) If we can overcome our kleshas, then we break the chain of causal effects that leads to rebirth in the six realms. The twelve links of dependent origination provides a theoretical framework, explaining how the disturbing emotions lead to rebirth in samsara. (Note: The twelvefold chain as we know it is the result of a gradual development. Shorter versions are also known. According to Schumann, the twelvefold chain may be a combination of three succeeding lives, each one of them shown by some of the samkaras.)

=== Complex process ===
The Buddha's teaching of karma is not strictly deterministic, but incorporated circumstantial factors, unlike that of the Jains. (Note: Thanissaro Bhikkhu: "Unlike the theory of linear causality — which led the Vedists and Jains to see the relationship between an act and its result as predictable and tit-for-tat — the principle of this/that conditionality makes that relationship inherently complex. The results of kamma experienced at any one point in time come not only from past kamma, but also from present kamma. This means that, although there are general patterns relating habitual acts to corresponding results [MN 135], there is no set one-for-one, tit-for-tat, relationship between a particular action and its results. Instead, the results are determined by the context of the act, both in terms of actions that preceded or followed it [MN 136] and in terms one's state of mind at the time of acting or experiencing the result [AN 3:99]. [...] The feedback loops inherent in this/that conditionality mean that the working out of any particular cause-effect relationship can be very complex indeed. This explains why the Buddha says in AN 4:77 that the results of kamma are imponderable. Only a person who has developed the mental range of a Buddha—another imponderable itself—would be able to trace the intricacies of the kammic network. The basic premise of kamma is simple—that skillful intentions lead to favorable results, and unskillful ones to unfavorable results—but the process by which those results work themselves out is so intricate that it cannot be fully mapped. We can compare this with the Mandelbrot set, a mathematical set generated by a simple equation, but whose graph is so complex that it will probably never be completely explored." (Note: Thanissaro Bhikkhu uses the Pali spelling for karma.)) It is not a rigid and mechanical process, but a flexible, fluid and dynamic process, and not all present conditions can be ascribed to karma. (Note: See also Sivaka Sutta (Samyutta Nikaya 36.21), in which the Buddha mentions eight different possible causes from which feelings can arise. Only the eighth cause can be ascribed to karma.) (Note: Sivaka Sutta (Samyutta Nikaya 36.21): "So any brahmans & contemplatives who are of the doctrine & view that whatever an individual feels — pleasure, pain, neither-pleasure-nor-pain — is entirely caused by what was done before — slip past what they themselves know, slip past what is agreed on by the world. Therefore I say that those brahmans & contemplatives are wrong.") There is no set linear relationship between a particular action and its results. The karmic effect of a deed is not determined solely by the deed itself, but also by the nature of the person who commits the deed, and by the circumstances in which it is committed.

Karma is also not the same as "fate" or "predestination". Karmic results are not a "judgement" imposed by a God or other all-powerful being, but rather the results of a natural process. (Note: Not a system of reward and punishment: Damien Keown: "Karma is not a system of rewards and punishments meted out by God but a kind of natural law akin to the law of gravity. Individuals are thus the sole authors of their good and bad fortune."; Peter Harvey states: - "The law of karma is seen as a natural law inherent in the nature of things, like the law of physics. It is not operated by a God, and indeed the gods are themselves under its sway. Good and bad rebirths are not, therefore, seen as "rewards" and "punishments", but as simply the natural results of certain kinds of action."; Dzongsar Khyentse: "[Karma] is usually understood as a sort of moralistic system of retribution—"bad" karma and "good" karma. But karma is simply a law of cause and effect, not to be confused with morality or ethics. No one, including Buddha, set the fundamental bar for what is negative and what is positive. Any motivation and action that steer us away from such truths as "all compounded things are impermanent" can result in negative consequences, or bad karma. And any action that brings us closer to understanding such truths as "all emotions are pain" can result in positive consequences, or good karma. At the end of the day, it was not for Buddha to judge; only you can truly know the motivation behind your actions."; Khandro Rinpoche states: "Buddhism is a nontheistic philosophy. We do not believe in a creator but in the causes and conditions that create certain circumstances that then come to fruition. This is called karma. It has nothing to do with judgement; there is no one keeping track of our karma and sending us up above or down below. Karma is simply the wholeness of a cause, or first action, and its effect, or fruition, which then becomes another cause. In fact, one karmic cause can have many fruitions, all of which can cause thousands more creations. Just as a handful of seed can ripen into a full field of grain, a small amount of karma can generate limitless effects."; Walpola Rahula states: "The theory of karma should not be confused with so-called 'moral justice' or 'reward and punishment'. The idea of moral justice, or reward and punishment, arises out of the conception of a supreme being, a God, who sits in judgment, who is a law-giver and who decides what is right and wrong. The term 'justice' is ambiguous and dangerous, and in its name more harm than good is done to humanity. The theory of karma is the theory of cause and effect, of action and reaction; it is a natural law, which has nothing to do with the idea of justice or reward and punishment. Every volitional action produces its effects or results. If a good action produces good effects and a bad action bad effects, it is not justice, or reward, or punishment meted out by anybody or any power sitting in judgment on your action, but this is in virtue of its own nature, its own law.") Certain experiences in life are the results of previous actions, but our responses to those experiences are not predetermined, although they bear their own fruit in the future. (Note: Rupert Gethin: "From the Buddhist perspective certain experiences in life are indeed the results of previous actions; but our responses to those experiences, whether wished for or unwished for, are not predetermined but represent new actions which in time bear their own fruit in the future. The Buddhist understanding of individual responsibility does not mean that we should never seek or expect another's assistance in order to better cope with the troubles of life. The belief that one's broken leg is at one level to be explained as the result of unwholesome actions performed in a previous life does not mean that one should not go to a doctor to have the broken leg set.") Unjust behaviour may lead to unfavorable circumstances which make it easier to commit more unjust behavior, but nevertheless the freedom not to commit unjust behavior remains.

=== Liberation from samsāra ===
The real importance of the doctrine of karma and its fruits lies in the recognition of the urgency to put a stop to the whole process. The Acintita Sutta warns that "the results of kamma" is one of the four incomprehensible subjects, subjects that are beyond all conceptualization and cannot be understood with logical thought or reason. (Note: Dasgupta explains that in Indian philosophy, acintya is "that which is to be unavoidably accepted for explaining facts, but which cannot stand the scrutiny of logic." See also the Aggi-Vacchagotta Sutta, "Discourse to Vatsagotra on the [Simile of] Fire," Majjhima Nikaya 72, in which the Buddha is questioned by Vatsagotra on the "ten indeterminate question," and the Buddha explains that a Tathagata is like a fire that has been extinguished, and is "deep, boundless, hard to fathom, like the sea".)

According to Gombrich, this sutra may have been a warning against the tendency, "probably from the Buddha's day until now", to understand the doctrine of karma "backwards", to explain unfavorable conditions in this life when no other explanations are available. Gaining a better rebirth may have been, and still is, the central goal for many people. The adoption, by laity, of Buddhist beliefs and practices is seen as a good thing, which brings merit and good rebirth, but does not result in Nirvana, and liberation from samsāra, the ultimate goal of the Buddha.

== Within the Pali suttas ==
According to the Buddhist tradition, the lord Buddha gained full and complete insight into the workings of karma at the time of his enlightenment. (Note: The understanding of rebirth, and the reappearance in accordance with one's deeds, are the first two knowledges that the Buddha is said to have acquired at his enlightenment, as described in Majjhima Nikaya 36.) According to Bronkhorst, these knowledges are later additions to the story, just like the notion of "liberating insight" itself. (Note: Bronkhorst is following Schmithausen, who, in his often-cited article On some Aspects of Descriptions or Theories of 'Liberating Insight' and 'Enlightenment' in Early Buddhism, notes that the mention of the four noble truths as constituting "liberating insight", which is attained after mastering the Rupa Jhanas, is a later addition to texts such as Majjhima Nikaya 36. It calls in question the reliability of these accounts, and the relation between dhyana and insight, which is a core problem in the study of early Buddhism. According to Tilmann Vetter, originally only the practice of dhyana, and the resulting calming of the mind may have constituted the liberating practice of the lord Buddha.)

In AN 5.292, the lord Buddha asserted that it is not possible to avoid experiencing the result of a karmic deed once it has been committed.

In the Anguttara Nikaya, it is stated that karmic results are experienced either in this life (P. diṭṭadhammika) or in future lives (P. samparāyika). The former may involve a readily observable connection between action and karmic consequence, such as when a thief is captured and tortured by the authorities, but the connection need not necessarily be that obvious and in fact usually is not observable.

The Samyutta Nikaya makes a basic distinction between past karma (P. purānakamma) which has already been incurred, and karma being created in the present (P. navakamma). Therefore, in the present one both creates new karma (P. navakamma) and encounters the result of past karma (P. kammavipāka). Karma in the early canon is also threefold: Mental action (S. manaḥkarman), bodily action (S. kāyakarman) and vocal action (S. vākkarman).

== Within Buddhist traditions ==
Various Buddhist philosophical schools developed within Buddhism, giving various interpretations regarding more refined points of karma. A major problem is the relation between the doctrine of no-self, and the "storage" of the traces of one's deeds, for which various solutions have been offered.

=== Early Indian Buddhism ===
==== Origins ====
The concept of karma originated in the Vedic religion, where it was related to the performance of rituals or the investment in good deeds to ensure the entrance to heaven after death, while other persons go to the underworld.

==== Pre-sectarian Buddhism ====
The concept of karma may have been of minor importance in early Buddhism. Schmithausen has questioned whether karma already played a role in the theory of rebirth of earliest Buddhism, noting that "the karma doctrine may have been incidental to early Buddhist soteriology." Langer notes that originally karma may have been only one of several concepts connected with rebirth. (Note: Langer: "When I was searching the Sanskrit texts for material, two things become apparent: first, rebirth, central as it is to Indian philosophy, is not found in the earliest texts; and second, rebirth and karman do not appear to be linked together from the beginning. In fact, originally karman seems to have been only one of several concepts connected with rebirth, but in the course of time it proved to be more popular than others. One of these 'other concepts' linked with rebirth is a curious notion of 'rebirth according to one's wish', sometimes referred to in the texts as kAmacAra. The wish — variously referred to in the texts as kAma or kratu — is directed to a particular form or place of rebirth and can be spontaneous (at the time of death) or cultivated for a long time. This understanding seems to have some affinity with the Buddhist notion that a mental effort, a positive state of mind, can bring about a good rebirth.") Tillman Vetter notes that in early Buddhism rebirth is ascribed to craving or ignorance. Buswell too notes that "Early Buddhism does not identify bodily and mental motion, but desire (or thirst, trsna), as the cause of karmic consequences." Matthews notes that "there is no single major systematic exposition" on the subject of karma and "an account has to be put together from the dozens of places where karma is mentioned in the texts," which may mean that the doctrine was incidental to the main perspective of early Buddhist soteriology.

According to Vetter, "the Buddha at first sought, and realized, "the deathless" (amata/amrta (Note: Stanislaw Schayer, a Polish scholar, argued in the 1930s that the Nikayas preserve elements of an archaic form of Buddhism which is close to Brahmanical beliefs, and survived in the Mahayana tradition. According to Schayer, one of these elements is that Nirvana was conceived as the attainment of immortality, and the gaining of a deathless sphere from which there would be no falling back. According to Falk, in the precanonical tradition, there is a threefold division of reality, the third realm being the realm of nirvana, the "amrta sphere," characterized by prajna. This nirvana is an "abode" or "place" which is gained by the enlightened holy man. According to Falk, this scheme is reflected in the precanonical conception of the path to liberation. The nirvanic element, as an "essence" or pure consciousness, is immanent within samsara. The three bodies are concentric realities, which are stripped away or abandoned, leaving only the nirodhakaya of the liberated person. See also Rita Langer (2007), Buddhist Rituals of Death and Rebirth: Contemporary Sri Lankan Practice and Its Origins, p.26-28, on "redeath" (punarmrtyu).)), which is concerned with the here and now. (Note: Tilmann Vetter, Das Erwachen des Buddha, referenced by Bronkhorst.) Only after this realization did he become acquainted with the doctrine of rebirth." Bronkhorst disagrees, and concludes that the Buddha "introduced a concept of karma that differed considerably from the commonly held views of his time." According to Bronkhorst, not physical and mental activities as such were seen as responsible for rebirth, but intentions and desire.

The doctrine of karma may have been especially important for common people, for whom it was more important to cope with life's immediate demands, such as the problems of pain, injustice, and death. The doctrine of karma met these exigencies, and in time it became an important soteriological aim in its own right.

==== Vaibhāṣika-Sarvāstivādin tradition ====
The Vaibhāśika-Sarvāstivāda was widely influential in India and beyond. Their understanding of karma in the Sarvāstivāda became normative for Buddhism in India and other countries. According to Dennis Hirota,

Sarvastivadins argued that there exists a dharma of "possession" (prapti), which functions with all karmic acts, so that each act or thought, though immediately passing away, creates the "possession" of that act in the continuum of instants we experience as a person. This possession itself is momentary, but continually reproduces a similar possession in the succeeding instant, even though the original act lies in the past. Through such continual regeneration, the act is "possessed" until the actualization of the result.

The Abhidharmahṛdaya by Dharmaśrī was the first systematic exposition of Vaibhāśika-Sarvāstivāda doctrine, and the third chapter, the Karma-varga, deals with the concept of karma systematically.

Another important exposition, the Mahāvibhāṣa, gives three definitions of karma:

1. action; karma is here supplanted in the text by the synonyms kriya or karitra, both of which mean "activity";
2. formal vinaya conduct;
3. human action as the agent of various effects; karma as that which links certain actions with certain effects, is the primary concern of the exposition.

The 4th century philosopher Vasubandhu compiled the Abhidharma-kośa, an extensive compendium which elaborated the positions of the Vaibhāṣika-Sarvāstivādin school on a wide range of issues raised by the early sutras. Chapter four of the Kośa is devoted to a study of karma, and chapters two and five contain formulations as to the mechanism of fruition and retribution. This became the main source of understanding of the perspective of early Buddhism for later Mahāyāna philosophers.

==== Dārṣṭāntika-Sautrāntika ====
The Dārṣṭāntika-Sautrāntika school pioneered the idea of karmic seeds (S. Bīja) and "the special modification of the psycho-physical series" (S. saṃtatipaṇāmaviśeṣa) to explain the workings of karma. According to Dennis Hirota,

[T]he Sautrantikas [...] insisted that each act exists only in the present instant and perishes immediately. To explain causation, they taught that with each karmic act a "perfuming" occurs which, though not a dharma or existent factor itself, leaves a residual impression in the succeeding series of mental instants, causing it to undergo a process of subtle evolution eventually leading to the act's result. Good and bad deeds performed are thus said to leave "seeds" or traces of disposition that will come to fruition.

=== Theravādin tradition ===
==== Canonical texts ====
In the Theravāda Abhidhamma and commentarial traditions, karma is taken up at length. The Abhidhamma Sangaha of Anuruddhācariya offers a treatment of the topic, with an exhaustive treatment in book five (5.3.7).

The Kathāvatthu, which discusses a number of controverted points related either directly or indirectly to the notion of kamma." This involved debate with the Pudgalavādin school, which postulated the provisional existence of the person (S. pudgala, P. puggala) to account for the ripening of karmic effects over time. The Kathāvatthu also records debate by the Theravādins with the Andhakas (who may have been Mahāsāṃghikas) regarding whether or not old age and death are the result (vipāka) of karma. The Theravāda maintained that they are not—not, apparently because there is no causal relation between the two, but because they wished to reserve the term vipāka strictly for mental results--"subjective phenomena arising through the effects of kamma."

In the canonical Theravāda view of kamma, "the belief that deeds done or ideas seized at the moment of death are particularly significant."

==== Transfer of merit ====
The Milindapañha, a paracanonical Theravāda text, offers some interpretations of karma theory at variance with the orthodox position. In particular, Nāgasena allows for the possibility of the transfer of merit to humans and one of the four classes of petas, perhaps in deference to folk belief. Nāgasena makes it clear that demerit cannot be transferred. One scholar asserts that the sharing of merit "can be linked to the Vedic śrāddha, for it was Buddhist practice not to upset existing traditions when well-established custom was not antithetic to Buddhist teaching."

The Petavatthu, which is fully canonical, endorses the transfer of merit even more widely, including the possibility of sharing merit with all petas.

=== Mahayana tradition ===
==== Indian Yogācāra tradition ====
In the Yogācāra philosophical tradition, one of the two principal Mahāyāna schools, the principle of karma was extended considerably. In the Yogācāra formulation, all experience without exception is said to result from the ripening of karma. Karmic seeds (S. bija) are said to be stored in the "storehouse consciousness" (S. ālayavijñāna) until such time as they ripen into experience. The term vāsāna ("perfuming") is also used, and Yogācārins debated whether vāsāna and bija were essentially the same, the seeds were the effect of the perfuming, or whether the perfuming simply affected the seeds. The seemingly external world is merely a "by-product" (adhipati-phala) of karma. The conditioning of the mind resulting from karma is called saṃskāra. The Treatise on Action (Karmasiddhiprakaraṇa), also by Vasubandhu, treats the subject of karma in detail from the Yogācāra perspective. According to scholar Dan Lusthaus,

Vasubandhu's Viṃśatikā (Twenty Verses) repeatedly emphasizes in a variety of ways that karma is intersubjective and that the course of each and every stream of consciousness (vijñāna-santāna, i.e., the changing individual) is profoundly influenced by its relations with other consciousness streams.

According to Bronkhorst, whereas in earlier systems it "was not clear how a series of completely mental events (the deed and its traces) could give rise to non-mental, material effects," with the (purported) idealism of the Yogācāra system this is not an issue.

In Mahāyāna traditions, karma is not the sole basis of rebirth. The rebirths of bodhisattvas after the seventh stage (S. bhūmi) are said to be consciously directed for the benefit of others still trapped in saṃsāra. Thus, theirs are not uncontrolled rebirths.

==== Mādhyamaka philosophy ====
Nāgārjuna articulated the difficulty in forming a karma theory in his most prominent work, the Mūlamadhyamakakārikā (Fundamental Verses on the Middle Way):

If (the act) lasted till the time of ripening, (the act) would be eternal. If (the act) were terminated, how could the terminated produce a fruit? (Note: MMK (XVII.6), cited in Dargyay, 1986, p.170)

The Mūlamadhyamakavṛtty-Akutobhayā, also generally attributed to Nāgārjuna, concludes that it is impossible both for the act to persist somehow and also for it to perish immediately and still have efficacy at a later time. (Note: Mūlamadhyamakavṛtty-Akutobhayā, sDe dge Tibetan Tripitaka (Tokyo, 1977) pp. 32, 4.5, cited in Dargyay, 1986, p.170.)

==== Tibetan Buddhism ====
In Tibetan Buddhism, the teachings on karma belong to the preliminary teachings, that turn the mind towards the Buddhist dharma.

In the Vajrayana tradition, negative past karma may be "purified" through such practices as meditation on Vajrasattva because they both are the mind's psychological phenomenon. The performer of the action, after having purified the karma, does not experience the negative results he or she otherwise would have. Engaging in the ten negative actions out of selfishness and delusions hurts all involved. Otherwise, loving others, receives love; whereas; people with closed hearts may be prevented from happiness. One good thing about karma is that it can be purified through confession, if the thoughts become positive. Within Guru Yoga seven branch offerings practice, confession is the antidote to aversion.

==== East Asian traditions ====
===== Zen =====
Dōgen Kigen argued in his Shobogenzo that karmic latencies are emphatically not empty, going so far as to claim that belief in the emptiness of karma should be characterized as "non-Buddhist," although he also states that the "law of karman has no concrete existence."

Zen's most famous koan about karma is called Baizhang's Wild Fox (百丈野狐). The story of the koan is about an ancient Zen teacher whose answer to a question presents a wrong view about karma by saying that the person who has a foundation in cultivating the great practice "does not fall into cause and effect." Because of his unskillful answer the teacher reaps the result of living 500 lives as a wild fox. He is then able to appear as a human and ask the same question to Zen teacher Baizhang, who answers, "He is not in the dark about cause and effect." Hearing this answer the old teacher is freed from the life of a wild fox. The Zen perspective avoids the duality of asserting that an enlightened person is either subject to or free from the law of karma and that the key is not being ignorant about karma.

===== Tendai =====
The Japanese Tendai/Pure Land teacher Genshin taught a series of ten reflections for a dying person that emphasized reflecting on the Amida Buddha as a means to purify vast amounts of karma.

===== Nichiren Buddhism =====
Nichiren Buddhism teaches that transformation and change through faith and practice changes adverse karma—negative causes made in the past that result in negative results in the present and future—to positive causes for benefits in the future.

== Modern interpretations and controversies ==
=== Social conditioning ===
Buddhist modernists often prefer to equate karma with social conditioning, in contradistinction with, as one scholar puts it, "early texts [which] give us little reason to interpret 'conditioning' as the infusion into the psyche of external social norms, or of awakening as simply transcending all psychological conditioning and social roles. Karmic conditioning drifts semantically toward 'cultural conditioning' under the influence of western discourses that elevate the individual over the social, cultural, and institutional. The traditional import of the karmic conditioning process, however, is primarily ethical and soteriological—actions condition circumstances in this and future lives."

Essentially, this understanding limits the scope of the traditional understanding of karmic effects so that it encompasses only saṃskāras—habits, dispositions and tendencies—and not external effects, while at the same time expanding the scope to include social conditioning that does not particularly involve volitional action.

=== Karma theory and social justice ===
Some western commentators and Buddhists have taken exception to aspects of karma theory, and have proposed revisions of various kinds. These proposals fall under the rubric of Buddhist modernism.

The "primary critique" of the Buddhist doctrine of karma is that some feel "karma may be socially and politically disempowering in its cultural effect, that without intending to do this, karma may in fact support social passivity or acquiescence in the face of oppression of various kinds." Dale S. Wright, a scholar specializing in Zen Buddhism, has proposed that the doctrine be reformulated for modern people, "separated from elements of supernatural thinking," so that karma is asserted to condition only personal qualities and dispositions rather than rebirth and external occurrences.

Loy argues that the idea of accumulating merit too easily becomes "spiritual materialism," a view echoed by other Buddhist modernists, (Note: Ken Jones, The Social Face of Buddhism: An Approach to Political and Social Activism, Wisdom Publications, 1989, quoted in "A Buddhist Ethic Without Karmic Rebirth?" by Winston L. King Journal of Buddhist Ethics Volume 1 1994) and further that karma has been used to rationalize racism, caste, economic oppression, birth handicaps and everything else.

Loy goes on to argue that the view that suffering such as that undergone by Holocaust victims could be attributed in part to the karmic ripenings of those victims is "fundamentalism, which blames the victims and rationalizes their horrific fate," and that this is "something no longer to be tolerated quietly. It is time for modern Buddhists and modern Buddhism to outgrow it" by revising or discarding the teachings on karma.

Other scholars have argued, however, that the teachings on karma do not encourage judgment and blame, given that the victims were not the same people who committed the acts, but rather were just part of the same mindstream-continuum with the past actors, and that the teachings on karma instead provide "a thoroughly satisfying explanation for suffering and loss" in which believers take comfort.

== See also ==
Buddhism

- Paṭṭhāna
- Anantarika-karma
- Consciousness (Buddhism)
- Development of Karma in Buddhism
- Index of Buddhism-related articles
- Karma
- Merit (Buddhism)
- Pratitya-samutpada (Dependent Origination)
- Samsara (Buddhism)
- Secular Buddhism
- Twelve Nidanas

Indian religions

- Karma in Hinduism
- Karma in Jainism

Other

- Myth of Er (Plato)

== Quotes ==
Subnotes

== Sources ==
=== Printed sources ===
==== Sutta Pitaka ====
- The Connected Discourses of the Buddha: A New Translation of the Samyutta Nikaya, translated by Bodhi, Bhikkhu, Boston: Wisdom Publications, 2000, ISBN 0-86171-331-1
- The Middle Length Discourses of the Buddha: A New Translation of the Majjhima Nikaya, translated by Nanamoli, Bhikkhu, Boston: Wisdom Publications, 1995, ISBN 0-86171-072-X

==== Buddhist teachers ====
- Dalai Lama (1998), The Four Noble Truths, Thorsons
- Dōgen, Kigen (1975), Shobogenzo: The Eye and Treasury of the True Law, Vol. 1, Kosen Nishiyama and John Stevens (translators), Sendai, Japan: Daihokkaikaku Publishing Co.
- Dzongsar Jamyang Khyentse (2012), Not for Happiness, A Guide to the So-Called Preliminary Practices, Shambala Publications, ISBN 978-1-61180-030-2
- Geshe Tashi Tsering (2005), The Four Noble Truths: The Foundation of Buddhist Thought, Volume I, Wisdom, Kindle Edition
- Goldstein, Joseph (2011), One Dharma: The Emerging Western Buddhism, HarperCollins, Kindle Edition
- Goldstein, Joseph (2013), Mindfulness: A Practical Guide to Awakening, Sounds True, Kindle Edition
- Kalu Rinpoche (1993), Luminous Mind: The Way of the Buddha, Wisdom, ISBN 0-86171-118-1
- Kamenetz, Rodger (1995), Jew in the Lotus: A Poet's Re-Discovery of Jewish Identity in Buddhist India, HarperOne
- Khandro Rinpoche (2003), This Precious Life, Shambhala
- Khenchen Konchog Gyaltshen (2009), A Complete Guide to the Buddhist Path, Snow Lion
- Lama Surya Das (1997), Awakening the Buddha Within, Broadway Books, Kindle Edition
- Leif, Judith (2009), Introduction to 'The Truth of Suffering and the Path of Liberation' by Chogyam Trungpa (edited by Judy Leif), Shambhala
- Mingyur Rinpoche (2007), The Joy of Living: Unlocking the Secret and Science of Happiness, Harmony Kindle Edition
- Moffitt, Philip (2008), Dancing with Life: Buddhist Insights for Finding Meaning and Joy in the Face of Suffering, Rodale, Kindle Edition
- Padmakara Translation Group (1994), The Words of My Perfect teacher, HarperCollins Publishers India
- Patrul Rinpoche (2011), The Words of My Perfect Teacher, First University Press Edition, ISBN 978-0-300-16532-6
- P. A. Payutto (1993), "Misunderstandings of The Law of Kamma", Good, Evil and Beyond: Kamma in the Buddha's Teaching, www.buddhanet.net, archived from the original on October 4, 2013
- Ringu Tulku (2005), Daring Steps Toward Fearlessness: The Three Vehicles of Tibetan Buddhism, Snow Lion
- Ringu Tulku (2012), Confusion Arises as Wisdom: Gampopa's Heart Advice on the Path of Mahamudra, Shambhala, Kindle Edition.
- Sonam Rinchen (2006), How Karma Works: The Twelve Links of Dependent Arising, Snow Lion
- Thubten Jinpa (2014), Mind Training: The Great Collection (Kindle Edition), Wisdom
- Thrangu Rinpoche (2001), The Twelve Links of Interdependent Origination, Snow Lion
- Thrangu Rinpoche (2012), Pointing Out The Dharmakaya: Teachings On The Ninth Karmapa's Text, Nama Buddha
- Traleg Kyabgon (2001), The Essence of Buddhism, Shambhala
- Tsongkhapa (2000), Cutler, Joshua W. C. (ed.), The Great Treatise On The Stages Of The Path To Enlightenment Vol 1, Snow Lion
- Walpola Rahula (2007), What the Buddha Taught (Kindle ed.), Grove Press
- Zopa Rinpoche, Lama Thubten (2004), Nicholas Ribush (ed.), Becoming Vajrasattva: the tantric path of purification / Lama Tubten Yeshe, Wisdom Publications, ISBN 0-86171-389-3

==== Scholarly sources ====
- Akizuki, Ryōmin (1990), New Mahāyāna: Buddhism for a Post-modern World, Jain Publishing Company
- Bronkhorst, Johannes (1993), The Two Traditions Of Meditation In Ancient India, Motilal Banarsidass
- Bronkhorst, Johannes (1998), "Did the Buddha Believe in Karma and Rebirth?", Journal of the International Association of Buddhist Studies, 21 (1): 1–20
- Bronkhorst, Johannes (2000), "Karma and Teleology: A Problem and its Solutions in Indian Philosophy", Studia Philologica, Monograph Series, vol. XV, Tokyo: The International Institute for Buddhist Studies of the International College for Advanced Buddhist Studies, archived from the original (PDF) on 2019-04-07
- Bucknell, Rod (1984), "The Buddhist Path to Liberation: An Analysis of the Listing of Stages", The Journal of the International Association of Buddhist Studies, 7 (2)
- Burke, Erin (2003), "Karmic Calculations: The Social Implications of Karmic Causality in Tibet", Chrestomathy: Annual Review of Undergraduate Research at the College of Charleston, Volume 2, 2003
- Buswell, Robert E., ed. (2004), Encyclopedia of Buddhism, Macmillan Reference USA
- Buswell, Robert E.; Lopez, Donald S. Jr., eds. (2013), The Princeton Dictionary of Buddhism, Princeton University Press
- Chapple, Christopher (1986), Karma and Creativity, State University of New York Press, ISBN 0-88706-250-4
- Collins, Steven (1999), Selfless Persons: Imagery and Thought in Theravada Buddhism, Cambridge University Press
- Conze, Edward (1967), Thirty years of Buddhis Studies. Selected essays by Edward Conze (PDF), Bruno Cassirer, archived from the original (PDF) on 2023-05-19
- Dargyay, Lobsang (1986), "Tsong-Kha-Pa's Concept of Karma", in Neufeldt (ed.), Karma and Rebirth: Post Classical Developments, State University of New York Press, ISBN 0-87395-990-6
- Dasgupta, Surendranath (1991), A History of Indian Philosophy, Volume 4, Motilal Banarsidass
- Dowling, Thomas L. (2006), "Karma Doctrine and Sectarian Development", in Narain, A.K. (ed.), Studies in Pali and Buddhism: A Memorial Volume in Honour of Bhikku Jagdish Kashyap, B.R. Publishing Corporation
- Fowler, Jeaneane; Fowler, Merv (2009). Chanting in the Hillsides. Portland, Oregon: Sussex Academic Press.
- Garfield, Jay L. (1995), The Fundamental Wisdom of the Middle Way. Nagarjuna's Mulamadhyamakakarika, Oxford University Press
- Garfield, Jay (2013), "Just Another Word for Nothing Left to Lose: Freedom, Agency and Ethics for Madhyamikas", in Dasti, Matthew R.; Bryant, Edwin F. (eds.), Free Will, Agency, and Selfhood in Indian Philosophy, Oxford University Press
- Gethin, Rupert (1998), Foundations of Buddhism, Oxford University Press
- Gombrich, Richard F. (1991), Buddhist Precept and Practice. Traditional Buddhism in the Rural Highlands of Ceylon, Motilall Banarsidass
- Gombrich, Richard (1996), Theravada Buddhism. A Social History from Ancient Benares to Modern Colombo, Routledge
- Gombrich, Richard F. (1997), How Buddhism Began. The Conditioned Genesis of the Early Teachings, New Delhi: Munshiram Manoharlal Publishers Pvt. Ltd.
- Gombrich, Richard (2009), What the Buddha Thought, Equinox
- Goodman, Steven D. (1992), "Situational Patterning: Pratītyasamutpāda", in Tarthang Tulku (ed.), Karma and Rebirth: Post Classical Developments, Crystal Mirror Series I-III, Dharma Publishing
- Harvey, Peter (1990), Introduction to Buddhism, Cambridge University Press
- Harvey, Brian Peter (1995), The Selfless Mind: Personality, Consciousness and Nirvāṇa in Early Buddhism, Routledge, ISBN 0-7007-0338-1
- Harvey, Brian Peter (2000), An Introduction to Buddhist ethics: Foundations, Values, and Issues, Routledge, ISBN 0-521-55640-6
- Hirota, Dennis (2004), "Karman: Buddhist concepts", in Jones, Lindsay (ed.), Encyclopedia of Religion (2nd ed.), Macmillan Reference USA
- Huntington, Clair W. Jr. (1986), The "Akutobhaya" and early Indian Madhyamika (Volumes I and II) (Buddhism, India, China, Tibet). Ph.D. thesis, University of Michigan
- Huntington, John C.; Bangdel, Dina (2003), The Circle of Bliss: Buddhist Meditational Art, Serindia
- Kalupahana, David (1975), Causality: The Central Philosophy of Buddhism, University of Hawaii Press
- Kalupahana, David J. (1992), The Principles of Buddhist Psychology, Delhi: Sri Satguru Publications
- Kalupahana, David (1995), Ethics in Early Buddhism, University of Hawaii Press
- Keown, Damien (2000), Buddhism: A Very Short Introduction, Oxford University Press, Kindle Edition
- Klostermaier, Klaus K. (1986), "Contemporary Conceptions of Karma and Rebirth Among North Indian Vaisnavas", in Neufeldt, Ronald W. (ed.), Karma and Rebirth: Post-classical Developments, Sri Satguru Publications
- Kopf, Gereon (2001), Beyond Personal Identity: Dōgen, Nishida, and a Phenomenology of No-self, Psychology Press
- Kragh, Ulrich Timme (2006), Early Buddhist Theories of Action and Result: A Study of Karmaphalasambandha, Candrakirti's Prasannapada, verses 17.1-20, Arbeitskreis für tibetische und buddhistische Studien, Universität Wien, ISBN 3-902501-03-0
- Lamotte, Etienne (1987), Karmasiddhi Prakarana: The Treatise on Action by Vasubandhu, Asian Humanities Press
- Lamotte, Etienne (1988), History of Indian Buddhism, Publications de l'Institut Orientaliste de Louvain
- Lamotte, Etienne (2001), Karmasiddhi Prakarana: The Treatise on Action by Vasubandhu, English translation by Leo M. Pruden, Asian Humanities Press
- Langer, Rita (2007), Buddhist Rituals of Death and Rebirth: Contemporary Sri Lankan Practice and Its Origins, Routledge
- Lichter, David; Epstein, Lawrence (1983), "Irony in Tibetan Notions of the Good Life", in Keyes, Charles F.; Daniel, E. Valentien (eds.), Karma: An Anthropological Inquiry, University of California Press
- Lindtner, Christian (1997), "The Problem of Precanonical Buddhism", Buddhist Studies Review, 14 (2): 2, doi:10.1558/bsrv.v14i2.14851, S2CID 247883744
- Lindtner, Christian (1999), "From Brahmanism to Buddhism", Asian Philosophy, 9 (1): 5–37, doi:10.1080/09552369908575487
- Lopez, Donald S. (2001), The Story of Buddhism, HarperCollins
- Loy, David R. (2008), Money, Sex, War, Karma: Notes for a Buddhist Revolution, Wisdom, ISBN 978-0861715589
- Lusthaus, Dan (2002), Buddhist Phenomenology: A philosophical Investigation of Yogācāra Buddhism and the Ch'eng Wei-shih lun, RoutledgeCurzon, ISBN 0-415-40610-2
- Macy, Joanna (1991), Mutual Causality in Buddhism and General Systems Theory: The Dharma of Natural Systems, SUNY
- Matthews, Bruce (1986), "Chapter Seven: Post-Classical Developments in the Concepts of Karma and Rebirth in Theravada Buddhism", in Neufeldt, Ronald W. (ed.), Karma and Rebirth: Post Classical Developments, State University of New York Press, ISBN 0-87395-990-6
- McDermott, James Paul (1975), "The Kathāvatthu Kamma Debates", Journal of the American Oriental Society, vol. 95, no. 3, Jul. – Sep., 1975
- McDermott, James Paul (1977), "Kamma in the Milindapañha", Journal of the American Oriental Society, vol. 97, no. 4, Oct. – Dec., 1977
- McDermott, James P. (1980), "Karma and Rebirth in Early Buddhism", in O'Flaherty, Wendy Doniger (ed.), Karma and Rebirth in Classical Indian Traditions, University of California Press, ISBN 0-520-03923-8
- McDermott, James Paul (1984), Development in the Early Buddhist Concept of Kamma/Karma, Munshiram Manoharlal Publishers, ISBN 81-215-0208-X
- McMahan, David L. (2008), The Making of Buddhist Modernism, Oxford University Press, ISBN 978-0-19-518327-6
- Monier-Williams (1964) [1899], A Sanskrit-English Dictionary (PDF), London: Oxford University Press
- Norgay, Khenpo Tenzin (2014), Dusting Off Your Buddha Nature: The Purpose of the Dzogchen Preliminaries, CreateSpace Independent Publishing Platform, ISBN 978-1505587319
- Padma, Sree; Barber, A.W., eds. (2009), Buddhism in the Krishna River Valley of Andhra, State University of New York Press
- Park, Changhwan (2007), The Sautrantika Theory of Seeds (bija) Revisited (PhD thesis), University of California, Berkeley
- Ray, Reginald (1999), Buddhist Saints in India: A Study in Buddhist Values and Orientations, Oxford University Press
- Reat, N. Ross (1998), The Salistamba Sutra, Motilal Banarsidass
- Reichenbach, Bruce (1988), "The Law of Karma and the Principle of Causation", Philosophy East and West, 38 (4): 399–410, doi:10.2307/1399118, JSTOR 1399118
- Reichenbach, Bruce (1990), The Law of Karma: A Philosophical Study, University of Hawaii Press, ISBN 0-8248-1352-9
- Ronkin, Noa (2005), Early Buddhist Metaphysics: the Making of a Philosophical Tradition, Routledge, ISBN 0-203-53706-8
- Ryose, Wataru (1987), A Study of the Abhidharmahrdaya: The Historical Development of the Concept of Karma In The Sarvastivada Thought (PDF) (PhD thesis), University of Wisconsin-Madison, archived from the original (PDF) on November 16, 2014
- Rhys Davids, Caroline Augusta (2007), Buddhism, Davids Press
- Samuel, Geoffrey (2010), The Origins of Yoga and Tantra. Indic Religions to the Thirteenth Century, Cambridge University Press
- Schumann, Hans Wolfgang (1997), Boeddhisme. Stichter, scholen en systemen, Asoka
- Schmithausen, Lambert; Wezler, Albrecht; Bruhn, Klaus; Alsdorf, Ludwig (1981). "On some aspects of descriptions or theories of 'liberating insight' and 'enlightenment' in early Buddhism". Studien zum Jainismus und Buddhismus. Alt- und neu-indische Studien. Vol. 23. Wiesbaden: Franz Steiner. ISBN 9783515028745. OCLC 1086295202.
- Schmithausen, Lambert (1986), "Critical Response", in Ronald W. Neufeldt (ed.), Karma and rebirth: Post-classical developments, SUNY
- Simmer-Brown, Judith (1987), "Seeing the Dependent Origination of Suffering as the Key to Liberation", Journal of Contemplative Psychotherapy, no. 4, The Naropa Institute
- Smith, Huston; Novak, Philip (2009), Buddhism: A Concise Introduction (Kindle ed.), HarperOne
- Vetter, Tillman (1987), "Some remarks on older parts of the Suttanipiita", in Seyfort Ruegg, Seyfort; Schmithausen, Lambert (eds.), Earliest Buddhism and Madhyamaka, BRILL
- Vetter, Tilmann (1988), The Ideas and Meditative Practices of Early Buddhism, BRILL
- Waldron, William S. (2003), The Buddhist Unconscious: The Alaya-vijñana in the context of Indian Buddhist Thought, Routledge
- Walser, Joseph (2005), Nāgārjuna in Context: Mahāyāna Buddhism and Early Indian Culture, Columbia University Press
- Wardner, A.K. (1970), Indian Buddhism
- Watson, Burton (1993), The Lotus Sutra, Columbia University Press
- Williams, Paul (2002), Buddhist Thought (Kindle ed.), Taylor & Francis
- Williams, Paul, ed. (2005), Buddhism—Critical Concepts in Religious Studies II, Shi Huifeng
- Wright, Dale S. (2004), "Critical Questions Towards a Naturalized Concept of Karma in Buddhism", Journal of Buddhist Ethics, 11, archived from the original on 2022-12-06
