= The unanswerable questions =

Philosophical questions that Buddha refused to answer

Translations of acinteyya
- English: imponderable, incomprehensible
- Sanskrit: acintya
- Pali: acinteyya
- Chinese: bukesiyi
- Japanese: fukashigi
- Korean: pulgasaūi
- Sinhala: අචින්ත්‍යය
- Tibetan: bsam gyis mi khyab pa
- Thai: อจินไตย
- Vietnamese: Bất khả tư nghị

In Buddhism, acinteyya (Pali), "imponderable" or "incomprehensible," avyākṛta (Sanskrit: अव्याकृत, Pali: avyākata, "unfathomable, unexpounded,"), and atakkāvacara, "beyond the sphere of reason," are unanswerable questions or undeclared questions. They are sets of questions that should not be thought about, and which the Buddha refused to answer, since this distracts from practice, and hinders the attainment of liberation. Various sets can be found within the Pali and Sanskrit texts, with four, and ten (Pali texts) or fourteen (Sanskrit texts) unanswerable questions.

== Etymology ==
The Sanskrit word acintya means "incomprehensible, surpassing thought, unthinkable, beyond thought." (Note: spokensanskrit.de, acintya) In Indian philosophy, acinteyya is

[T]hat which is to be unavoidably accepted for explaining facts, but which cannot stand the scrutiny of logic.

It is also defined as

That which cannot or should not be thought, the unthinkable, incomprehensible, impenetrable, that which transcends the limits of thinking and over which therefore one should not ponder. (Note: Acinteyya - definition)

The term is used to describe the ultimate reality that is beyond all conceptualization. Thoughts here-about should not be pursued, because they are not conducive to the attainment of liberation.

Synonymous terms are avyākṛta "indeterminate questions," and atakkāvacara, "beyond the sphere of reason."

== Atakkāvacara ==
Nirvana is atakkāvacara, "beyond logical reasoning". It is difficult to comprehend with logic or reason, since it is not a concrete "thing." It cannot be explained with logic or reason to someone who has not attained it by themselves.

== Acinteyya – four imponderables ==
The four imponderables are identified in the Acintita Sutta, Anguttara Nikaya 4.77, as follows:

1. The Buddha-range of the Buddhas [i.e., the range of powers a Buddha develops as a result of becoming a Buddha];
2. The jhana-range of one absorbed in jhana [i.e., the range of powers that one may obtain while absorbed in jhana];
3. The [precise working out of the] results of kamma (Karma in Sanskrit);
4. Speculation about [the origin, etc., of] the cosmos is an imponderable that is not to be speculated about (SN 56.41 develops this speculation as the ten indeterminate).

== Avyākṛta ==
=== Ten indeterminate questions ===
The Cula-Malunkyovada Sutta, MN 63 and 72 contains a list of ten unanswered questions about certain views (ditthi):

1. The world is eternal.
2. The world is not eternal.
3. The world is (spatially) infinite.
4. The world is not (spatially) infinite.
5. The being imbued with a life force is identical with the body.
6. The being imbued with a life force is not identical with the body.
7. The Tathagata (a perfectly enlightened being) exists after death.
8. The Tathagata does not exist after death.
9. The Tathagata both exists and does not exist after death.
10. The Tathagata neither exists nor does not exist after death.

In the Aggi-Vacchagotta Sutta, "Discourse to Vatsagotra on the [Simile of] Fire," Majjhima Nikaya 72, (Note: accesstoinsight, Aggi-Vacchagotta Sutta: To Vacchagotta on Fire, translated by Thanissaro Bhikkhu) the Buddha is questioned by Vatsagotra on the "ten indeterminate question:" avyākrta

- Is the cosmos eternal, non-eternal, finite, infinite?
- Are the soul and the body (jīvam & sarīram) similar or different?
- After death, a Tathagata exists, does not exist, both exists and does not exist, neither exists nor does not exist?

The Buddha refuses to answer the questions, avoiding getting entangled in debate, but answers with a simile:

"And suppose someone were to ask you, 'This fire that has gone out in front of you, in which direction from here has it gone? East? West? North? Or south?' Thus asked, how would you reply?"
"That doesn't apply, Master Gotama. Any fire burning dependent on a sustenance of grass and timber, being unnourished — from having consumed that sustenance and not being offered any other — is classified simply as 'out' (unbound)."
"Even so, Vaccha, any physical form by which one describing the Tathagata would describe him: That the Tathagata has abandoned, its root destroyed, made like a palmyra stump, deprived of the conditions of development, not destined for future arising. Freed from the classification of form, Vaccha, the Tathagata is deep, boundless, hard to fathom, like the sea. 'Reappears' doesn't apply. 'Does not reappear' doesn't apply. 'Both does & does not reappear' doesn't apply. 'Neither reappears nor does not reappear' doesn't apply.

=== Fourteen questions ===
The extant Sanskrit tradition (and the Tibetan and Chinese texts following the Sanskrit) expand the list of imponderables to fourteen.

1. Is the world eternal? 2. ...or not? 3. ...or both? 4. ...or neither? (Pali texts omit "both" and "neither")

5. Is the world finite? 6. ...or not? 7. ...or both? 8. ...or neither? (Pali texts omit "both" and "neither")

9. Is the self identical with the body? 10. ...or is it different from the body?

11. Does the Tathagata (Buddha) exist after death? 12. ...or not? 13. ...or both? 14. ...or neither?

== Sixteen questions - Sabbasava-Sutta ==
The Sabbasava Sutta (Majjhima Nikaya 2) also mentions 16 questions which are seen as "unwise reflection" and lead to attachment to views relating to a self.

1. What am I?
2. How am I?
3. Am I?
4. Am I not?
5. Did I exist in the past?
6. Did I not exist in the past?
7. What was I in the past?
8. How was I in the past?
9. Having been what, did I become what in the past?
10. Shall I exist in future?
11. Shall I not exist in future?
12. What shall I be in future?
13. How shall I be in future?
14. Having been what, shall I become what in future?
15. Whence came this person?
16. Whither will he go?

The Buddha states that it is unwise to be attached to both views of having and perceiving a self and views about not having a self. Any view which sees the self as "permanent, stable, everlasting, unchanging, remaining the same for ever and ever" is "becoming enmeshed in views, a jungle of views, a wilderness of views; scuffling in views, the agitation (struggle) of views, the fetter of views."

== Hindrance to liberation ==
Pondering over the four acinteyya is a hindrance to the attainment of liberation. Sacca-samyutta, "The Four Noble Truths", Samyutta Nikaya 56: (Note: suttacentral, Samyutta Nikaya 56, Reflection about the World)

Therefore, o monks, do not brood over [any of these views] Such brooding, O monks, is senseless, has nothing to do with genuine pure conduct (s. ādibrahmacariyaka-sīla), does not lead to aversion, detachment, extinction, nor to peace, to full comprehension, enlightenment and Nibbāna, etc.

And the Aggi-Vacchagotta Sutta, "Discourse to Vatsagotra on the [Simile of] Fire," Majjhima Nikaya 72:

Vaccha, [any of these views] is a thicket of views, a wilderness of views, a contortion of views, a writhing of views, a fetter of views. It is accompanied by suffering, distress, despair, & fever, and it does not lead to disenchantment, dispassion, cessation; to calm, direct knowledge, full Awakening, Unbinding.

The Buddha further warns that

Whoever speculates about these things would go mad & experience vexation. (Note: accesstoinsight, Acintita Sutta: Unconjecturable, translated by Thanissaro Bhikkhu)

== See also ==
- Noble Silence
- Similarities between Pyrrhonism and Buddhism
- Kant's antinomies
- Acatalepsy

== Sources ==
Printed sources

- Sujato, Bhikkhu (2012), A History of Mindfulness, Santipada
- Bhikkhu Thanissaro (2010), Wings to Awakening: Part I (PDF), Metta Forest Monastery, Valley Center, CA
- Bodhi, Bhikkhu (2000), The Connected Discourses of the Buddha: A New Translation of the Samyutta Nikaya, Boston: Wisdom Publications, ISBN 0-86171-331-1
- Buswell, Robert E.; Lopez, Donald S. Jr., eds. (2013), The Princeton Dictionary of Buddhism, Princeton University Press, ISBN 9780691157863
- Dasgupta, Surendranath (1991), A History of Indian Philosophy, Volume 4, Motilal Banarsidass Publ.
- Kalupahanna, David J. (1976), Buddhist Philosophy: A Historical Analysis, University of Hawaii Press
- nath, Samir (1998), Encyclopaedic Dictionary of Buddhism. Volume 3, Sarup 7 Sons

Web-sources
