= Vipāka =

Indian philosophical term

Vipāka (Sanskrit and Pāli) is a Jain and Buddhist term for the ripening or maturation of karma (Pāli kamma), or intentional actions. The theory of karmic action and result (kamma-vipāka) is a central belief within the Buddhist tradition.

== Alternate translations ==
The term vipaka is translated as:

- effect (Ven. D. Mahinda Thera)
- maturation (Keown, 2000, loc 810–813)
- ripening (Harvey, 1990, p. 39)
- result

== Within the discourses ==
The Samyutta Nikaya states:

According to the seed that’s sown,
So is the fruit you reap therefrom,
Doer of good will gather good,
Doer of evil, evil reaps,
Down is the seed and thou shalt taste the fruit thereof.

— Saṃyutta Nikāya

== See also ==
- Karma in Buddhism
- Phala
- Rebirth

== Sources ==
- Harvey, Peter (1990), Introduction to Buddhism, Cambridge University Press
