= Seri-Vanija Jathaka Katha =

Seri-Vanija Jathaka is one of the five hundred and fifty jatakas of the Buddha. A Jataka (Pali: ජාතක - means Birth) is any of the stories of former lives of the Buddha, which are preserved in Buddhism. Some Jataka tales are scattered in different parts of the Pali: Pali canon of Buddhist writings, including a group of 35 that were collected for didactic purposes. This Seri jataka has included as the third story in the first volume of the Jataka Tales Compendium

== Introduction ==
The Tathāgata (The Blessed One preached this Seri Vanija Jathaka when he was in the Jethawanarama of Savatthi. revealing one of his previous lives as Bodhisattva (a being whose essence is enlightenment) taking the point of ethics of tittle-tattle, related to a non-persevering Bhikku. The Bhikkhu was brought to the presence to the Buddha and asked 'Why, bawath mahana, what is the reason to lose perseverance as an observer of the precepts and a part of the Ariya Maha Savaka Sangha? Do you wish to get rid of Dukkha by means of any way rather than following the ariya ata maga? You know, a trader named Seri lost a Golden Bowl worth hundred thousand Kahawanu and his own life because he lost his perseverance. Then the other Bhikkhus who were attended, made a request to unveil the story of Seri which was concealed by the darkness of Samsara. According to the Buddha, it was as follow.

== The Jathaka Katha ==
Once upon a time, 500 years ago, the Bodhisattva was born in a family of trading cast and was famous named Kacchaputa, a dealer in pots and pans, in his age. One time, He reached the city of Andhapura, where was situated beyond the river Neelavahini, accompanied by another greedy trader called Seri, for business. Both of them apportioned the streets of the city amongst them and were selling their goods. At that time a rich family of nobility had become very poor. All the younger brothers, the children and the wealth were lost survived by one granddaughter with her grandmother. They lived by serving others for wages. There was in their house among other pots, a golden bowl which the great merchant had used to have his meals and being unused it was cov- ered with soot. They did not know that it was a golden bowl. The greedy merchant at that time was going through this street advertising his wares the young girl saw this merchant and appealed to the grandmother to buy a trinket for her. The grandmother replied

"We are poor, what can we give him for the trinket?"

The young girl reminded her of the bowl and being unable to escape her plead- ing she brought the bowl and gave it to the trader and asked him for a trinket in exchange. The greedy trader took the bowl and suspecting it to be a golden bowl drew a line over it by a needle and knowing it for certain that it was gold, through that he would take it by giving nothing and said.

"What value there in this bowl? Not even half a farthing"

He then threw it on the floor and went away.
Meanwhile, the Bodhisattva thought that it would be in order enter the street where one trader had already gone and left it and entered the same street shout- ing

"Trinkets for sale"

and came to the very door of that house. The young girl again made the same request to her grandmother who retorted that the earlier trader threw away the bowl and went away and there is nothing else to be offered to the next trader. The girl replied

"Grandmother, Dear, That trader was harsh: but this one is pleasant and soft spoken and we will give this bowl to him and get the trinkets."

The trader was invited to and the bowl was given to him who at once knew it to be a golden bowl and said.

"Mother, this bowl is invaluable and I don't have goods for such value"

The grandmother replied that the earlier trader threw it away saying it was not worth even half a farthing and it has turned to be golden bowl because of your goodness and merit and we will give it to you and you can give us something for it and take it away. The Bodhisattva then gave hundred pieces of gold coins (Kahavanu) and stock of goods worth five hundred retaining his scales, the bag and eight pieces of money. The Great Bodhisattva then speeded up to the river ferry, paid eight pieces to the ferry-man and jumped to the boat. The greedy trader meanwhile went to that house again and requested for the bowl saying that he will pay something. The grandmother and the girl scolded him telling that he made the pure golden bowl worth not even half a farthing whereas a righteous trader perhaps his teacher bought it for thousand pieces and went away. Hearing this he was so grieved that he lost the bowl and due to intense sorrow, he lost his senses, flung away the coins he had and the goods at the door of that house, threw away his upper clothes, took the scales in his hand like a club and chased after the Bodhisattva. Arriving at the river-side he saw the Bodhisattva crossing the river and shouted

"You ferry-man, will you stop that boat"

The Bodhisattva advised the ferryman not to reverse the boat but proceed. The greedy trader seeing the Bodhisattva proceeding despite this request was seized by intense sorrow. His heart was burning and warm blood oozed out from the mouth and from heart break he perished. Contracting hatred against the Bodhisattva. This is the first enmity of the Devadatta Sthavira har- boured against the Bodhisattva. The Bodhisattva thereafter died after engaging in charity and such other activities. The Lord of the Three Worlds explained this lesson and declared even as in the past, the trader Serivanija did not obtain the pure golden bowl worth hundred thousand and did not make an attempt to possess it. You the Sangha will grieve by not endeavouring to achieve the correct path like the golden bowl. And if you do not abandon the perseverance, you will achieve the Lokottara Dhamma. He then expounded the Four Noble Truths after which the persevering members achieved the Fruit of Arhat.

== Revelation of Jathi ==
Connection The foolish trader at that time is the present Devadatta Sthavira and the intelligent trader at that time is myself, the Exalted Buddha, the Teacher of the Three Worlds.
