= Noble Silence =

Term attributed to the Gautama Buddha

Noble Silence is a term attributed to the Gautama Buddha, for his reported responses to certain questions about reality. One such instance is when he was asked the fourteen unanswerable questions. In similar situations he often responded to antinomy-based descriptions of reality by saying that both antithetical options presented to him were inappropriate.

A specific reference to noble silence in Buddha's teaching involved an occasion where Buddha forbade his disciples from continuing a discussion, saying that in such congregation the discussion of the sacred doctrine is proper or practicing noble silence. This does not indicate misology or disdain for philosophy on the Buddha's part. Rather, it indicates that he viewed these questions as not leading to true knowledge.

== Pali Canon ==
While silence is generally thought to be something observable on the outside of a person — an external state, such as whether they are talking or not — in the Pali Canon, a noble state is an internal state — one which is synonymous with jhana.

"But what is noble silence?' Then the thought occurred to me, 'There is the case where a monk, with the stilling of directed thoughts & evaluations, [1] enters & remains in the second jhāna: rapture & pleasure born of concentration, unification of awareness free from directed thought & evaluation — internal assurance. This is called noble silence.'"

Of the eight jhanas (meditative states), that in which the inner dialogue goes silent is the second.

== Concept ==
Noble silence requires an understanding of the Buddhist conceptualization of the word "noble." It is described as something or someone who has united three aspects of his being, namely: body, speech, and mind. Such a union provides individuals the awareness of their whole body and understanding who they are and, in the process, allow others to be who they are as well. It is, thus, not merely the absence of speaking because sometimes not talking cannot be considered noble. This is said to lead to a subsiding of thought and examination so that a bhikkhu can enter and dwell in the second jhana, a meditative state characterized by internal confidence and a unified mind.

An interpretation also noted that noble silence is not about silence for silence’s sake. Rather, it is an injunction if the primary ideal of conversing about the Dhamma is not met. If the disciples cannot do so, then they are encouraged to pursue noble silence — one that requires the attainment of second absorption. One account also cited how Buddha used noble silence when he was asked a question, opting to discuss another topic, which he deemed more significant to the questioner.

In Vipassana Meditation, the noble silence covers a period of nine to ten days and this includes the so-called silence in deed, which means no gestures or the use of communication tools such as mobile phones, computer, and the Internet.

== See also ==
- Buddhist philosophy
- Hesychia
