= Nyorai =

Buddha's name

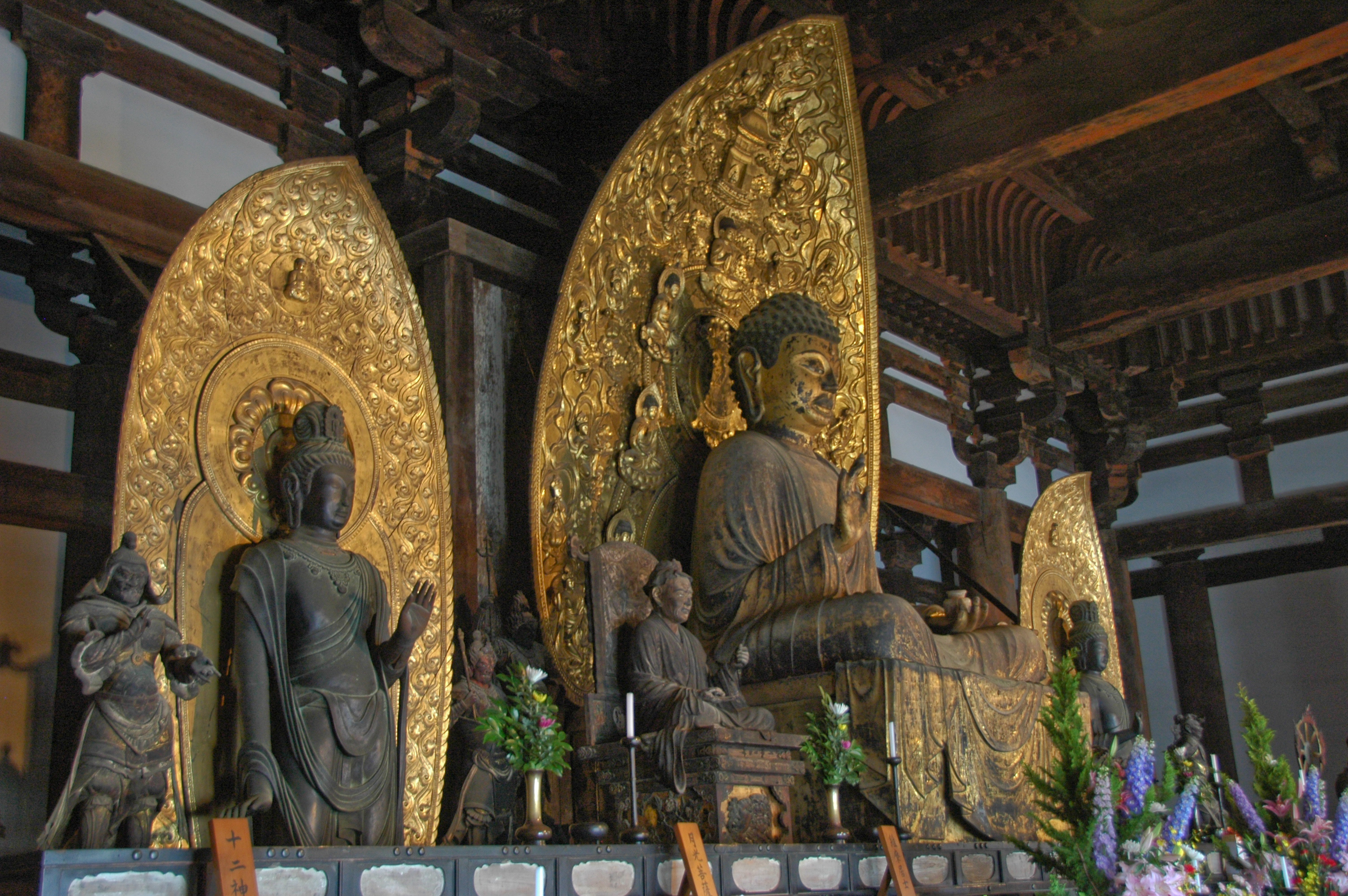
Yakushi Nyorai flanked by two attendants, Nikkō and Gakkō Bosatsu, a triad known as Yakushi Sanzon

The Japanese word Nyorai (如来, thus come) is the translation of the Sanskrit and Pali word Tathagata, the term the historical Buddha used most often to refer to himself. Among his Japanese honorifics, it is the one expressing the highest degree of respect. Although originally applied only to Buddha himself, with the advent of Mahayana Buddhism Tathāgata (and therefore Nyorai) came to be used for all those who have achieved enlightenment, entities which occupy the highest of the four ranks of the Japanese Buddhist pantheon. Their rank is accordingly called the Nyorai-bu (如来部; or Nyorai category).

== Etymology ==
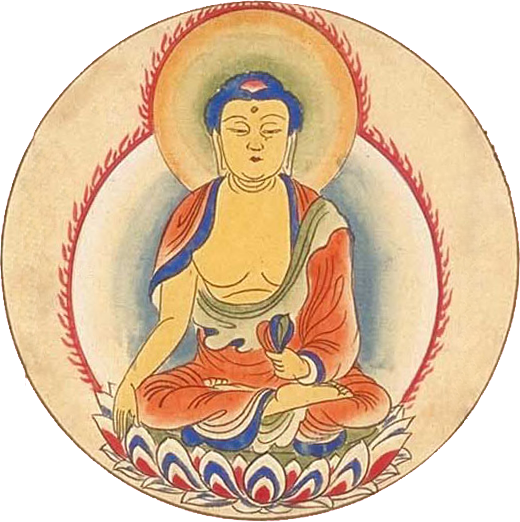
Ashuku Nyorai

The Buddhist honorific Nyorai is the Japanese translation of Tathāgata, a Sanskrit and Pali compound word whose exact meaning is uncertain. It was widely used in Indian religions other than Brahmanism as a term of respect for religious figures of exceptional stature, but it ended up being used only by Buddhism. Sanskrit grammar offers two possibilities for breaking up the compound: either tathā (thus) and āgata (come) or tathā (thus) and gata (gone), and Buddhist commentaries offer as many as eight different interpretations of its meaning. The most widely accepted is “one who has thus (tathā) gone (gata)” or “one who has thus (tathā) come (āgata)”, signifying that Buddha himself was no more than one in a long series of persons in the past and future to achieve enlightenment, and teach others how to do the same.

In translating Tathāgata as Nyorai, however, the interpretation made of the two components was slightly different. The first half was assumed to mean "reality as it is", and was translated with the kanji (如), which means roughly "as it is". The second (āgata) was assumed to be simply the past tense of the verb "to come", and translated literally (来; to come). The Japanese word's meaning is therefore "he who came from tathata (the ultimate nature of all things)" to lead human beings to salvation.

=== Alternative translations ===
Nyorai is not the only existing Japanese translation of tathāgata, as another was created based on a different interpretation of the original Indian term. If the compound word is interpreted as composed by tathā, meaning "as it is", and gata, meaning "gone", the translation is Nyokyo or Nyoko (如去; gone as is), an interpretation adopted by other strands of Buddhism, for example Tibetan Buddhism. In this case, the term means "he who has gone to tathata" through meditation and satori.

== Important Nyorai ==
In Japanese the historical Buddha is called Shaka Nyorai (釈迦如来; or Shakyamuni Tathāgata). Originally the honorific Tathāgata was used exclusively for Buddha himself however, with the advent of Mahayana Buddhism, it came to be applied to entities called buddhas which, like him, were men who had achieved enlightenment. Although strictly speaking buddhas are not gods, they are represented as if they were.

Buddhas in Japan are called Nyorai and they occupy the top of the four ranks of the Japanese Buddhist pantheon, called Nyorai-bu (如来部), literally "Nyorai category". The Nyorai-bu is followed in order by the Bosatsu-bu (bodhisattva), Myōō-bu (Wisdom Kings), and ten-bu (Deva). The most important Nyorai of the Japanese Buddhist pantheon (apart from the historical Buddha, Shaka Nyorai) are Amida Nyorai (Amitābha), Dainichi (or Birushanabutsu) Nyorai (Vairocana), and Yakushi Nyorai (Bhaisajyaguru). Other common Nyorai are Ashuku Nyorai (Akshobhya), Fukūjōju Nyorai (Amoghasiddhi), Hōshō Nyorai (Ratnasambhava), Miroku Nyorai (Maitreya), and Tahō Nyorai (Prabhutaratna). Although this category includes only Indian deities, because of the honji suijaku theory some were believed to have ties with Japanese kami. Amaterasu for example was considered another appearance of Dainichi Nyorai.

=== Nyorai iconography in Japan ===
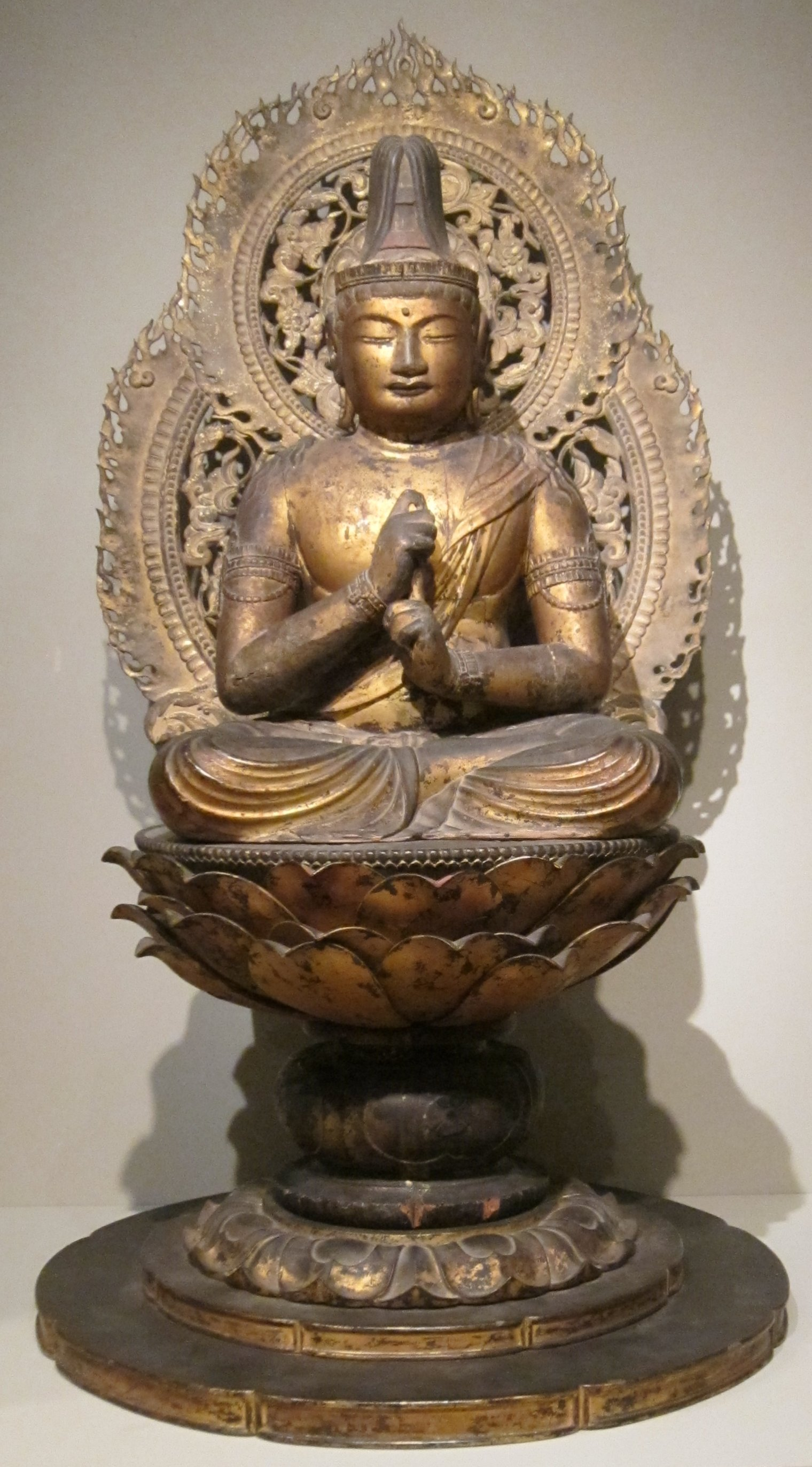
Dainichi Nyorai

Statues and portraits of a Nyorai are common in Japan, and a characteristic iconography makes them easy to recognize. Distinguishing one Nyorai from the other is however difficult, as most are externally almost identical, and differ just in details.

Statues of Shaka Nyorai can show him sitting, standing or lying down (entering nirvana). The others can be standing or sitting. With the exception of Yakushi Nyorai, all statues are empty-handed and their fingers make a mudra. To the contrary, Yakushi Nyorai's right hand always holds some object, either a sphere or a small jar, while the other makes a mudra. Dainichi Nyorai's hands make a characteristic mudra (the fingers of his right hand hold his left hand's index finger, see photo). Excepted Dainichi Nyorai, who is represented with some body ornamentation like a bodhisattva, all statues wear just a simple robe without body ornamentation, signs of priesthood. This is because they represent someone who has reached enlightenment. The robe can cover one or both shoulders. The head has a round protuberance on top with the hair divided in tight curls. Both features are exclusive characteristics of this rank, but the curls can be missing.

The progressive idealization of the Buddhas brought to the attribution of non-human or superhuman characteristics. Consequently, a Nyorai's body must have 32 primary characteristics, among them webbed fingers, very long arms, long earlobes and a 3-meter aura, plus 80 minor ones. For practical reasons, only some, for example long earlobes, are actually present in any given statue.

==== Groups of statues ====
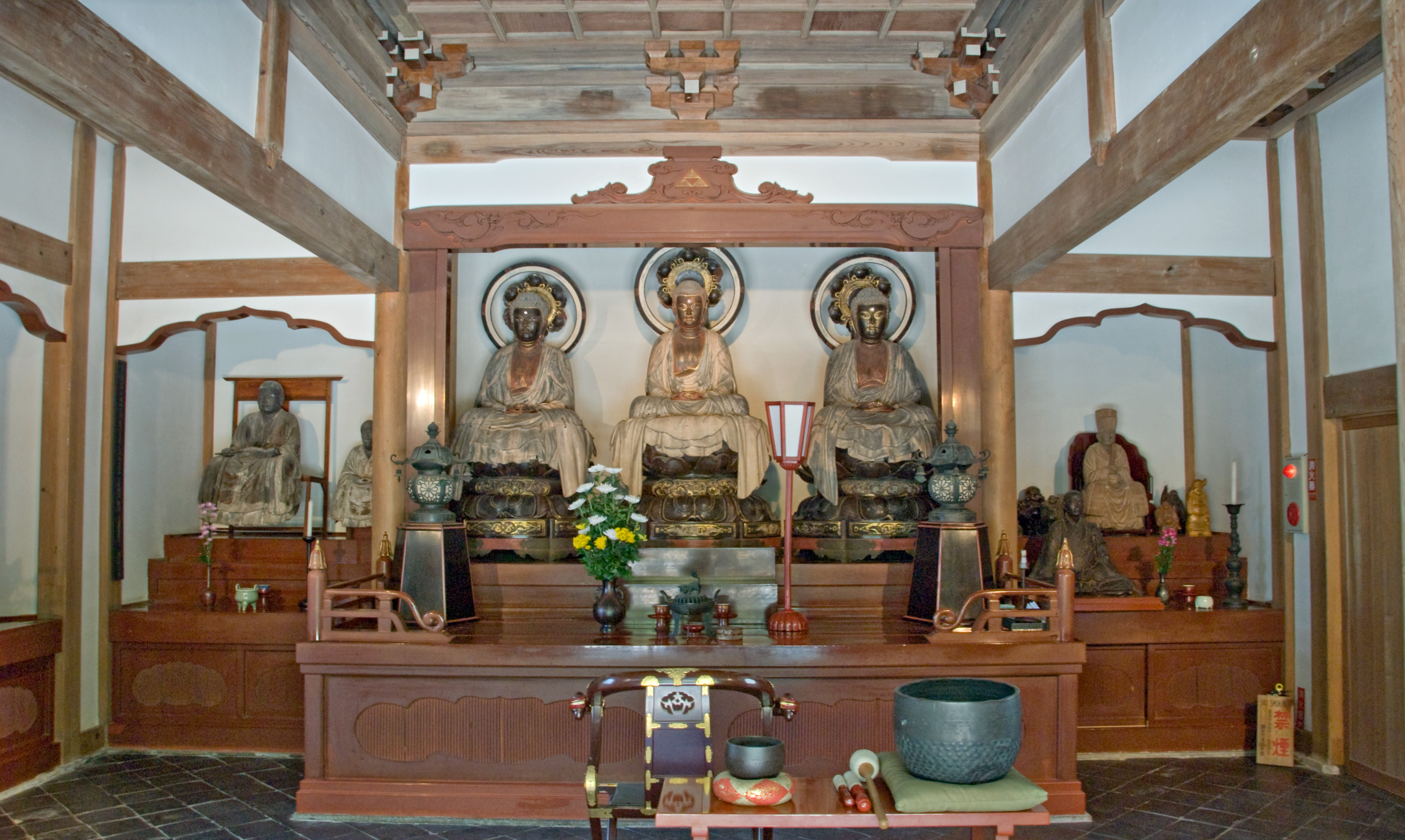
The Sanzebutsu

Sometimes Nyorai statues can form a group, as in the case of the Sanzebutsu (三世仏, lit. three worlds buddhas). Amida represents the past, Shaka the present, and Miroku the future.

The Go-Dai-Nyorai (五大如来, Five Great Nyorai) is a group of five important Nyorai, usually composed of Dainichi Nyorai, Amida Nyorai, Ashuku Nyorai, Hōshō Nyorai, and Fukūjōju Nyorai. They appear often, both as a group of statues and as painted figures in mandalas. Each Nyorai has a fixed position oriented in the cardinal direction he is traditionally associated with. Several different groupings of the Go-Dai-Nyorai are in use, but in all of them Dainichi Nyorai is in the center. The following is one of the most common.

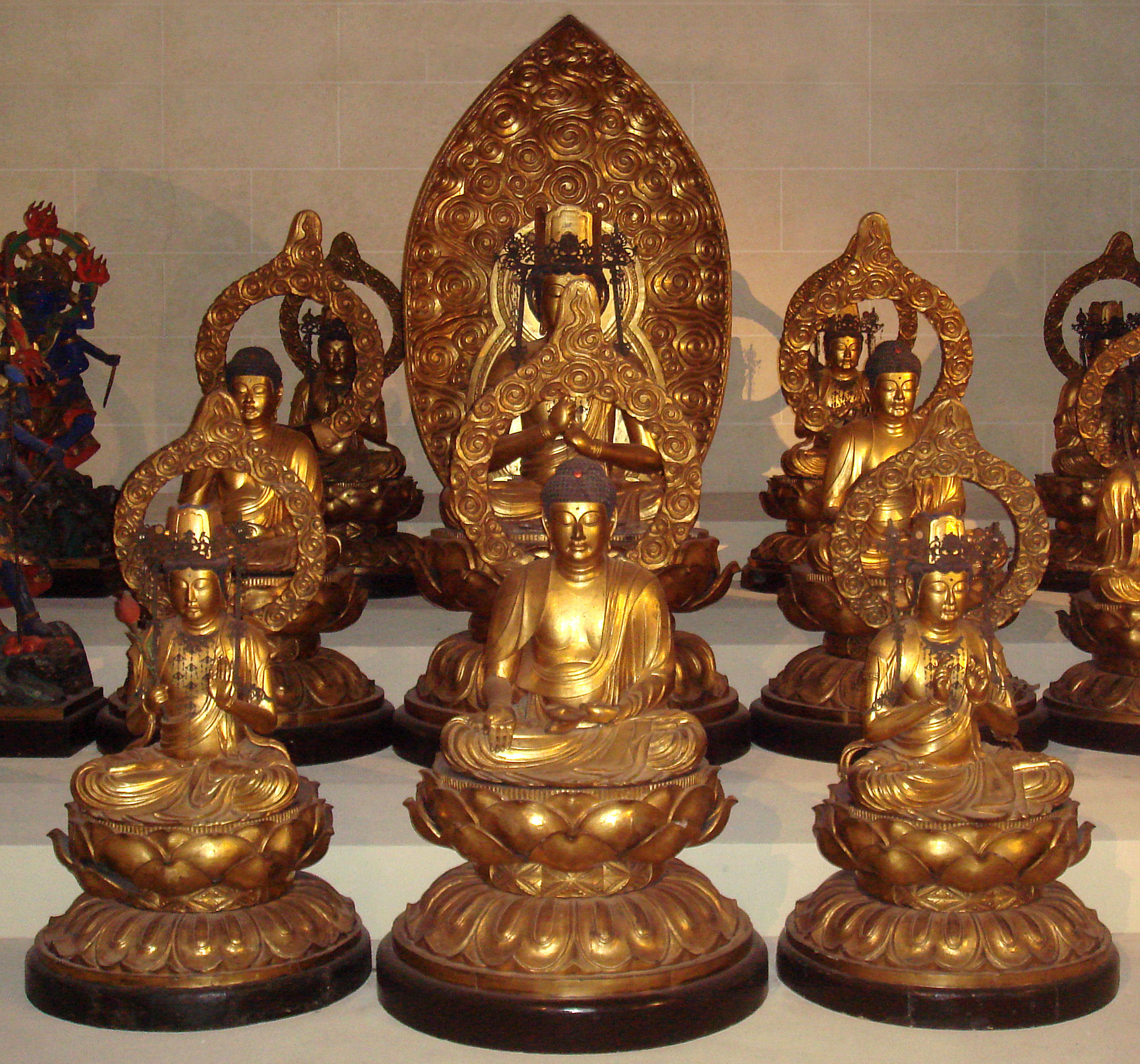
The Godai Nyorai

Fukūjōju Nyorai

(north)

Amida Nyorai

(west)

Dainichi Nyorai

(principal deity)

Ashuku Nyorai

(east)

Hōshō Nyorai

(south)

Sometimes a group consists of a single Nyorai flanked by minor figures like bosatsu or myōō. For example, in the Yakushi Sanzon (薬師三尊, Yakushi Triad), shown in the photo at the top of the page, Yakushi Nyorai is flanked by Nikkō Bosatsu and Gakkō Bosatsu, two deities one rank below him.
