= Development of Karma in Buddhism =

Karma is an important topic in Buddhist thought. The concept may have been of minor importance in early Buddhism, and various interpretations have evolved throughout time. A main problem in Buddhist philosophy is how karma and rebirth are possible, when there is no self to be reborn, and how the traces or "seeds" of karma are stored throughout time in consciousness.

== Vedic religion ==
The concept of karma originated in the Vedic religion, where it was related to the performance of rituals or the investment in good deeds to ensure the entrance to heaven after death, while other persons go to the underworld.

== Early Buddhism ==
The concept of karma may have been of minor importance in early Buddhism. Schmithausen has questioned whether karma already played a role in the theory of rebirth of earliest Buddhism, noting that "the karma doctrine may have been incidental to early Buddhist soteriology." Langer notes that originally karma may have been only one of several concepts connected with rebirth. (Note: Langer: "When I was searching the Sanskrit texts for material, two things become apparent: first, rebirth, central as it is to Indian philosophy, is not found in the earliest texts; and second, rebirth and karman do not appear to be linked together from the beginning. In fact, originally karman seems to have been only one of several concepts connected with rebirth, but in the course of time it proved to be more popular than others. One of these ‘other concepts’ linked with rebirth is a curious notion of ‘rebirth according to one’s wish’, sometimes referred to in the texts as kAmacAra. The wish — variously referred to in the texts as kAma or kratu — is directed to a particular form or place of rebirth and can be spontaneous (at the time of death) or cultivated for a long time. This understanding seems to have some affinity with the Buddhist notion that a mental effort, a positive state of mind, can bring about a good rebirth."'"`UNIQ--ref-0000000B-QINU`"') Tillman Vetter notes that in early Buddhism rebirth is ascribed to craving or ignorance. Buswell too notes that "Early Buddhism does not identify bodily and mental motion, but desire (or thirst, trsna), as the cause of karmic consequences." Matthews notes that there is no cohesive presentation of karma in the Sutta Pitaka, which may mean that the doctrine was incidental to the main perspective of early Buddhist soteriology.

According to Vetter, the "Buddha at first sought, and realized, "the deathless" (amata/amrta (Note: Stanislaw Schayer, a Polish scholar, argued in the 1930s that the Nikayas preserve elements of an archaic form of Buddhism which is close to Brahmanical beliefs,'"`UNIQ--ref-00000011-QINU`"''"`UNIQ--ref-00000012-QINU`"''"`UNIQ--ref-00000013-QINU`"''"`UNIQ--ref-00000014-QINU`"' and survived in the Mahayana tradition.'"`UNIQ--ref-00000015-QINU`"''"`UNIQ--ref-00000016-QINU`"' According to Schayer, one of these elements is that Nirvana was conceived as the attainment of immortality, and the gaining of a deathless sphere from which there would be no falling back.'"`UNIQ--ref-00000017-QINU`"' According to Falk, in the precanonical tradition, there is a threefold division of reality, the third realm being the realm of nirvana, the "amrta sphere," characterized by prajna. This nirvana is an "abode" or "place" which is gained by the enlightened holy man.'"`UNIQ--ref-00000018-QINU`"' According to Falk, this scheme is reflected in the precanonical conception of the path to liberation.'"`UNIQ--ref-00000019-QINU`"' The nirvanic element, as an "essence" or pure consciousness, is immanent within samsara. The three bodies are concentric realities, which are stripped away or abandoned, leaving only the nirodhakaya of the liberated person.'"`UNIQ--ref-0000001A-QINU`"' See also Rita Langer (2007), Buddhist Rituals of Death and Rebirth: Contemporary Sri Lankan Practice and Its Origins, p.26-28, on "redeath" (punarmrtyu).'"`UNIQ--ref-0000001B-QINU`"')), which is concerned with the here and now. (Note: Tilmann Vetter, Das Erwachen des Buddha, referenced by Bronkhorst.'"`UNIQ--ref-0000001D-QINU`"') Only after this realization did he become acquainted with the doctrine of rebirth." Bronkhorst disagrees, and concludes that the Buddha "introduced a concept of karma that differed considerably from the commonly held views of his time." According to Bronkhorst, not physical and mental activities as such were seen as responsible for rebirth, but intentions and desire.

The doctrine of karma may have been especially important for common people, for whom it was more important to cope with life's immediate demands, such as the problems of pain, injustice, and death. The doctrine of karma met these exigencies, and in time it became an important soteriological aim in its own right.

== The Three Knowledges ==
The understanding of rebirth, and the reappearance in accordance with one's deeds, are the first two knowledges that the Buddha is said to have acquired at his enlightenment. According to the Buddhist tradition, the Buddha gained full and complete insight into the workings of karma at the time of his enlightenment. According to Bronkhorst, these knowledges are later additions to the story, just like the notion of "liberating insight" itself. According to Tilmann Vetter, originally only the practice of dhyana, and the resulting calming of the mind may have constituted the liberating practice of the Buddha.

== Later developments ==
According to Vetter, probably in the first centuries after the Buddha's death the following ideas were introduced or became important:

1. all evil deeds must be requited or at least be superseded by good deeds before a person can become released,
2. pleasant and unpleasant feelings in a human existence are the result of former deeds,
3. evil behavior and its results form a vicious circle from which one can hardly escape,
4. Gotama could become Buddha because he did good deeds through countless former lives, devoting their result to the aim of enlightenment,
5. by confession and repentance one can (partly) annul an evil deed,
6. evil deeds of non-Arhats (as to Arhats see point 1) can be superseded by great merits,
7. one can and should transfer merit to others, especially for their spiritual development.

== See also ==
- Index of Buddhism-related articles
- Karma
- Karma in Buddhism
- Secular Buddhism

== Sources ==
=== Printed sources ===
- Akizuki, Ryōmin (1990), New Mahāyāna: Buddhism for a Post-modern World, Jain Publishing Company
- Bronkhorst, Johannes (1993), The Two Traditions Of Meditation In Ancient India, Motilal Banarsidass Publ.
- Bronkhorst, Johannes (1998), "Did the Buddha Believe in Karma and Rebirth?", Journal of the International Association of Buddhist Studies, 21 (1): 1–20
- Bronkhorst, Johannes (2000), "Karma and Teleology: A Problem and its Solutions in Indian Philosophy" (PDF), The International Institute for Buddhist Studies of the International College for Advanced Buddhist Studies, Tokyo
- Buswell, Robert E., ed. (2004), Encyclopedia of Buddhism, Macmillan Reference USA
- Conze, Edward (1967), Thirty years of Buddhis Studies. Selected essays by Edward Conze (PDF), Bruno Cassirer
- Goldstein, Joseph (2011), One Dharma: The Emerging Western Buddhism, HarperCollins, Kindle Edition
- Langer, Rita (2007), Buddhist Rituals of Death and Rebirth: Contemporary Sri Lankan Practice and Its Origins, Routledge
- Lindtner, Christian (1997), "The Problem of Precanonical Buddhism", Buddhist Studies Review, 14 (2): 2, doi:10.1558/bsrv.v14i2.14851
- Lindtner, Christian (1999), "From Brahmanism to Buddhism", Asian Philosophy, 9 (1): 5–37, doi:10.1080/09552369908575487
- Matthews, Bruce (1986), "Chapter Seven: Post-Classical Developments in the Concepts of Karma and Rebirth in Theravada Buddhism", in Neufeldt, Ronald W. (ed.), Karma and Rebirth: Post Classical Developments, State University of New York Press, ISBN 0-87395-990-6
- Ray, Reginald (1999), Buddhist Saints in India: A Study in Buddhist Values and Orientations, Oxford University Press
- Reat, N. Ross (1998), The Salistamba Sutra, Motilal Banarsidass
- Samuel, Geoffrey (2010), The Origins of Yoga and Tantra. Indic Religions to the Thirteenth Century, Cambridge University Press
- Schmithausen, Lambert (1986), Critical Response. In: Ronald W. Neufeldt (ed.), "Karma and rebirth: Post-classical developments", SUNY
- Vetter, Tillman (1987), "Some remarks on older parts of the Suttanipiita", in Seyfort Ruegg, Seyfort; Schmithausen, Lambert (eds.), Earliest Buddhism and Madhyamaka, BRILL
- Vetter, Tilmann (1988), The Ideas and Meditative Practices of Early Buddhism, BRILL
