= Phala =

Sanskrit term

Phala is a Sanskrit term meaning fruit, generally referring to the fruit of one's actions in Hinduism and Buddhism.

== Within Hinduism ==
=== Karma and its fruit ===
In Hinduism, the term phala is translated as fruition, results, effects.

In Hindu literature, a phalashruti is a meritorious verse that describes the benefits of listening to a given text and details its greatness.

The Yoga-Sûtra of Patañjali (verse 2.36) states:

As truthfulness (satya) is achieved, the fruits of actions naturally result according to the will of the Yogi. (satya pratisthayam kriya phala ashrayatvam)

=== Phalashruti ===
A phalashruti is a verse at the end of a text which asserts the value of the text and the benefits of attending to it. It is a genre convention of Hindu literature, appearing at the end of a text or one of its constituent sections. Such a verse offers a description of the benefits that could be accrued by an adherent from the recitation or listening to a given text. It may also extol the prominence of a work, as well as provide the appropriate context for its perusal.

== Within Buddhism ==
Within Buddhism, the term phala is used to refer to the fruition or results of actions according to the doctrine of karmic action and result.

=== Alternate translations ===
The term phala is translated as:

- fruit (Harvey, 1990, p. 39; Keown, 2000, loc 810-813)
- fruition
- effect (Ven. D. Mahinda Thera)

=== Ariya-phala ===
The term Ariya phala is used to refer specifically to the fruition of following the Buddhist path. The fruition for each of the four levels of the path is identified as follows:

1. Sota patti phala, fruition of stream entry
2. Sakadagamiphala, fruition of once returning
3. Anagami phala, fruition of non returning
4. Arahatta phala, fruition of the worthy one or perfected one

=== Maha-phala ===
The term Maha-phala refers to the ten "Great fruits" of the contemplative life. According to the Samaññaphala Sutta, the 10 “Great fruits” (DN 2) are:

1. Equanimity (upekkha)
2. Fearlessness (nibbhaya)
3. Freedom from unhappiness & suffering (Asukhacaadukkha)
4. Meditative Absorption (jhana/samādhi)
5. Out-of-body experience (Manomaya)
6. Clairaudience (dibba-sota)
7. Intuition and mental telepathy (ceto-pariya-ñána)
8. Recollection of past lives (Patisandhi)
9. Clairvoyance (dibba-cakkhu)
10. End of anxiety & mental agitation (nirvāna)

== Sources ==
- Harvey, Peter (1990), Introduction to Buddhism, Cambridge University Press
