= Aggi-Vacchagotta Sutta =

72nd Sutta in the Majjhima Nikaya, Pāli Canon

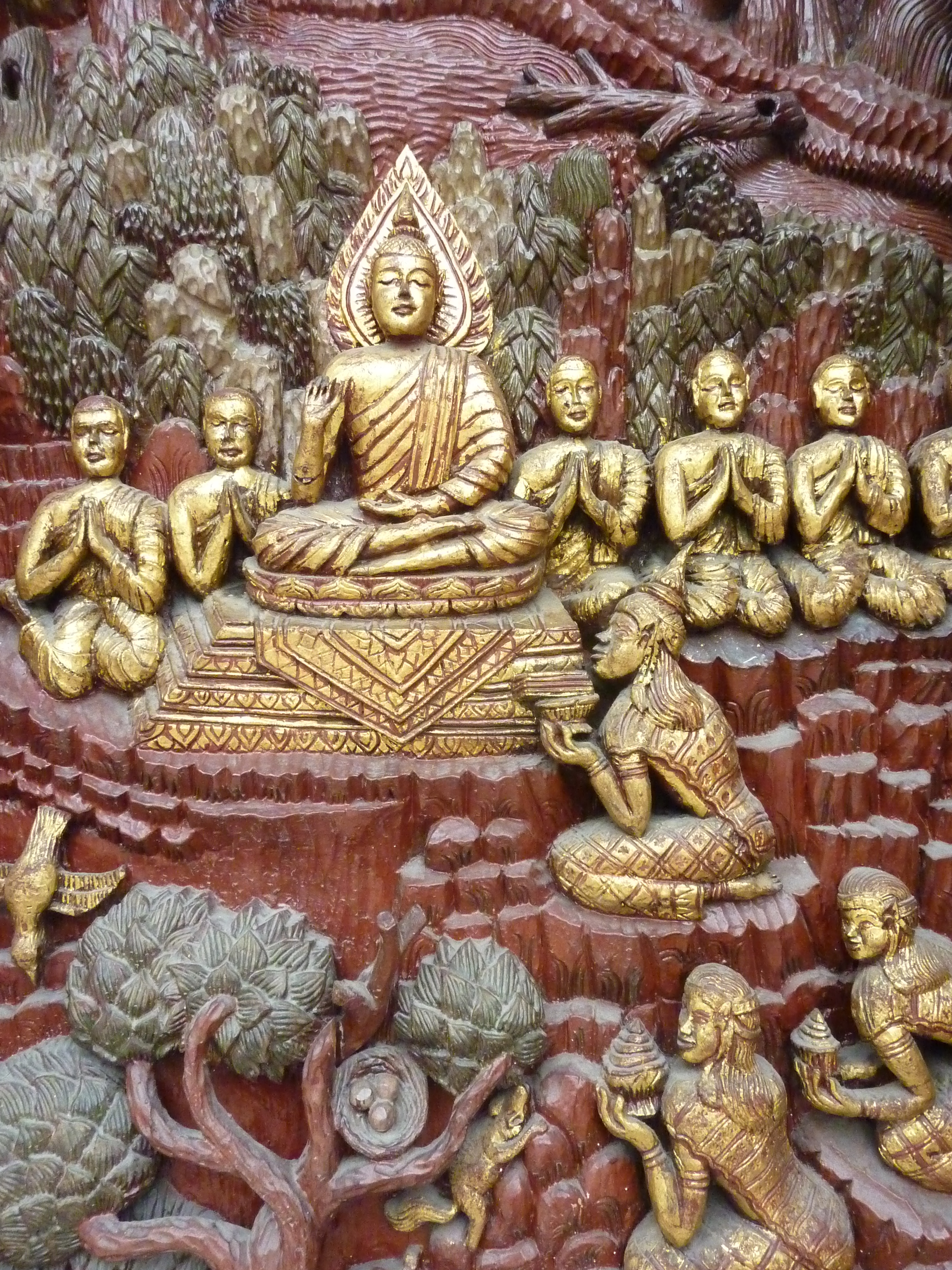
Buddha preaching

The Aggi-Vacchagotta Sutta is a Buddhist sutta in the Majjhima Nikāya of the Tripitaka. This sutta is number 72 in the Third Division on Wanderers [Paribbājakavagga]. In this sutta, Gautama Buddha clarifies his views on the nature of existence and explains the nature of Nibbana to Vacchagotta by means of a simile. The one who realizes Nibbāna is compared to an extinguished fire.

== The thicket of views ==
Vacchagotta first asks the Buddha whether he holds particular views on the extent of the cosmos, the relationship between mind and body, and the nature of a Tathāgata's existence after death. To all the questions, Gautama Buddha simply replies he does not hold such views. Vacchagotta expresses confusion at this answer and asks why the Buddha takes no position regarding his questions.

The Buddha explains that each question leads to an unresolvable thicket of views which will cause suffering and distress if investigated. Because such investigation cannot lead to enlightened understanding and nirvana, the Buddha takes no position on these subjects. The Tathagata is released due to true discernment and cessation of clinging.

== Nirvana ==
Vacchagotta questions further. Where does the monk who has been released reappear? The following exchange results:

"'Reappear,' Vaccha, doesn't apply."

"In that case, Master Gotama, he does not reappear."

"'Does not reappear,' Vaccha, doesn't apply."

"...both does & does not reappear."

"...doesn't apply."

"...neither does nor does not reappear."

"...doesn't apply."

Vacchagotta's confusion increases. The Buddha asks him in which direction a fire goes when it has gone out. Vaccha replies that the question "does not fit the case ... For the fire that depended on fuel ... when that fuel has all gone, and it can get no other, being thus without nutriment, it is said to be extinct." The Buddha then explains: "In exactly the same way ..., all form by which one could predicate the existence of the saint, all that form has been abandoned, uprooted, pulled out of the ground like a palmyra-tree, and become non-existent and not liable to spring up again in the future. The saint ... who has been released from what is styled form is deep, immeasurable, unfathomable, like the mighty ocean." The same is then said of the other aggregates. A tathāgata has abandoned that clinging to the personality factors that render the mind a bounded, measurable entity, and is instead "freed from being reckoned by" all or any of them, even in life. The skandhas have been seen to be a burden, and an enlightened individual is one with "burden dropped".

A variety of similar passages make it clear that the metaphor of going out refers equally to liberation in life. In the Aggi-Vacchagotta Sutta itself, it is clear that the Buddha is the subject of the metaphor, and the Buddha has already "uprooted" or "annihilated" the five aggregates. In Sn 1074, it is stated that the sage cannot be "reckoned" because he is freed from the category "name" or, more generally, concepts. The absence of this precludes the possibility of reckoning or articulating a state of affairs; "name" here refers to the concepts or apperceptions that make propositions possible.

The fire metaphor used in the Aggi-Vacchagotta Sutta (which is also used elsewhere) is a radical way of making the point that the liberated sage is beyond phenomenal experience. It also makes the additional point that this indefinable, transcendent state is the sage's state even during life. This idea goes against the early Brahminic notion of liberation at death.

== Dabba Sutta ==
The Udāna's Dabba Sutta makes use of related imagery:

Just as the bourn is not known
Of the gradual fading glow
Given off by the furnace-heated iron,
As it is struck with the smith's hammer,

So there is no pointing to the bourn
Of those perfectly released
Who have crossed the flood
Of bondage to sense desires
And attained unshakable bliss.

— Dabba Sutta, Udāna VIII.10

In this case, the simile of the first four lines of the original Pali is obscure, and the above translation is only tentative regarding its intention.
