= Tathāgata =

Buddhist term, referring to the Buddha as transcendent

Translations of Tathāgata
- English: One who has thus gone Thus Come One
- Sanskrit: तथागत
- Pali: 𑀢𑀣𑀸𑀕𑀢
- Bengali: তথাগত
- Burmese: တထာဂတ (MLCTS: tathāgata)
- Chinese: 如來 (Pinyin: rúlaí/ Cantonese=yu loi)
- Japanese: 如来 (Rōmaji: nyorai)
- Khmer: តថាគត (tathakut)
- Korean: 여래 (RR: yeorae)
- Mongolian: ᠲᠡᠭᠦᠨᠴᠢᠯᠡᠨ ᠢᠷᠡᠭᠰᠡᠨ Түүнчлэн ирсэн
- Sinhala: තථාගත (tathāgata)
- Tagalog: Tathagata
- Tibetan: དེ་བཞིན་གཤེགས་པ་ (dezhin sheg pa)
- Thai: ตถาคต
- Vietnamese: Như Lai

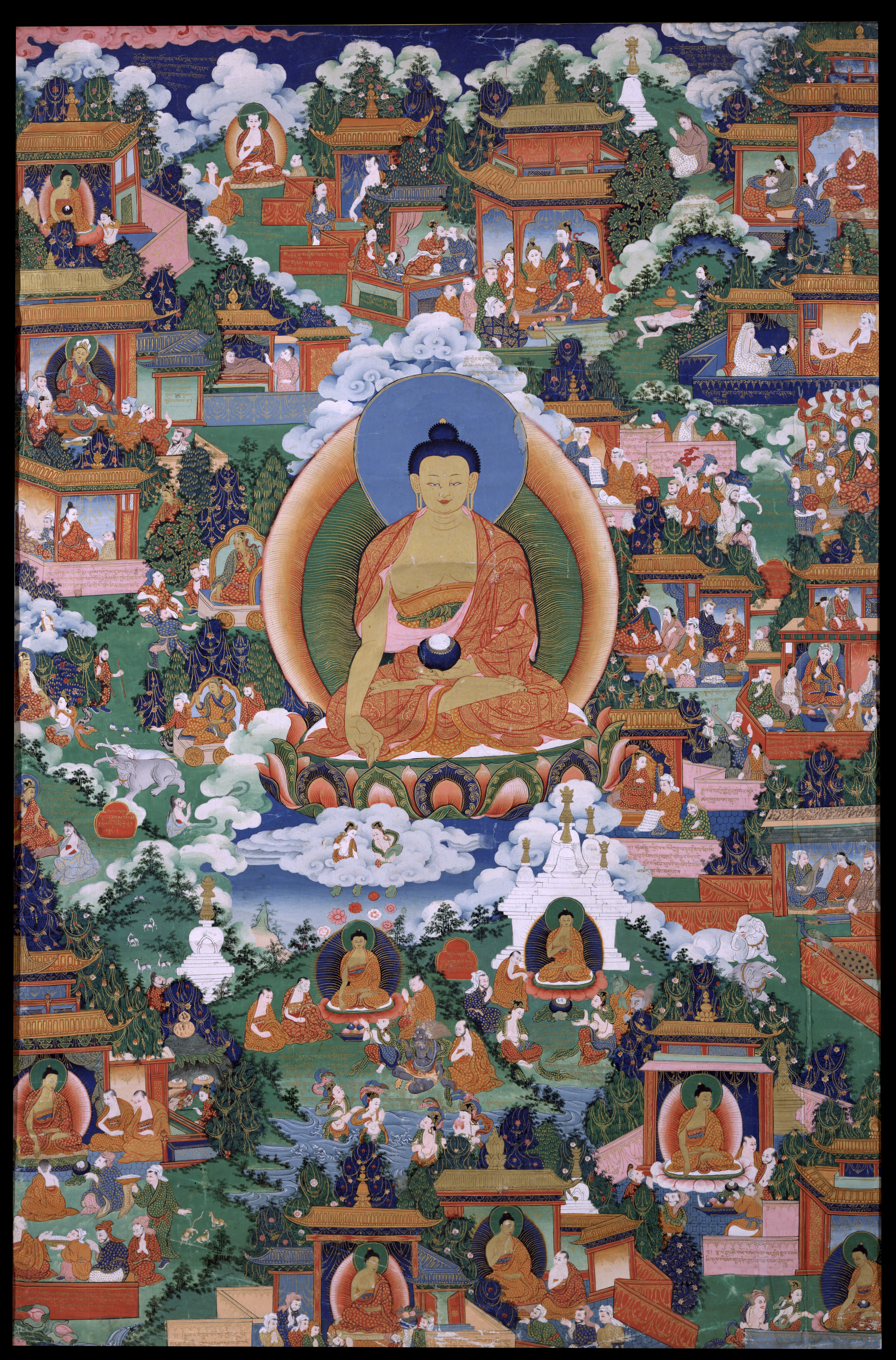
Tathagata, Shakyamuni Buddha in a thangka painting showing the avadana legend scenes

Tathāgata (Sanskrit: [tɐˈtʰaːɡɐtɐ]), translated into Chinese as Rulai (如来; 如來; Rúlái) and English as Thus Come One, is a Pali and Sanskrit word used in ancient India for a person who has attained the highest religious goal. Gautama Buddha, the founder of Buddhism, used it when referring to himself or other past Buddhas in the Pāli Canon. Likewise, in the Mahayana corpus, it is an epithet of Shakyamuni Buddha and the other celestial buddhas. The term is often thought to mean either "one who has thus gone" (tathā-gata), "one who has thus come" (tathā-āgata), or sometimes "one who has thus not gone" (tathā-agata). This is interpreted as signifying that the Tathāgata is beyond all coming and going – beyond all transitory phenomena. There are, however, other interpretations and the precise original meaning of the word is not certain.

The Buddha is quoted on numerous occasions in the Pali Canon as referring to himself as the Tathāgata instead of using the pronouns me, I or myself. This may be meant to emphasize by implication that the teaching is uttered by one who has transcended the human condition, one beyond the otherwise endless cycle of rebirth and death, i.e. beyond dukkha.

== Etymology and interpretation ==
The word's original significance is not known and there has been speculation about it since at least the time of Buddhaghosa, who gives eight interpretations of the word, each with different etymological support, in his commentary on the Digha Nikaya, the Sumangalavilasini:

1. He who has arrived in such fashion, i.e. who has worked his way upwards to perfection for the world's good in the same fashion as all previous Buddhas.
2. He who walked in such fashion, i.e. (a) he who at birth took the seven equal steps in the same fashion as all previous Buddhas or (b) he who in the same way as all previous Buddhas went his way to Buddhahood through the four Jhanas and the Paths.
3. He who by the path of knowledge has come at the real essentials of things.
4. He who has won Truth.
5. He who has discerned Truth.
6. He who declares Truth.
7. He whose words and deeds accord.
8. The great physician whose medicine is all-potent.

Monks, in the world with its devas, Mara and Brahma, in this generation with its ascetics and brahmins, devas and humans, whatever is seen, heard, sensed and cognized, attained, searched into, pondered over by the mind—all that is fully understood by the Tathagata. That is why he is called the Tathagata. (Anguttara Nikaya 4:23)

Modern scholarly opinion generally opines that Sanskrit grammar offers at least two possibilities for breaking up the compound word: either tathā and āgata (via a sandhi rule ā + ā → ā), or tathā and gata. Tathā means "thus" in Sanskrit and Pali, and Buddhist thought takes this to refer to what is called "reality as-it-is" (yathābhūta). This reality is also referred to as "thusness" or "suchness" (tathatā), indicating simply that it (reality) is what it is.

Tathāgata is defined as someone who "knows and sees reality as-it-is" (yathā bhūta ñāna dassana). Gata ("gone") is the past passive participle of the verbal root gam ("go, travel"). Āgata ("come") is the past passive participle of the verb meaning "come, arrive". In this interpretation, Tathāgata means literally either "the one who has gone to suchness" or "the one who has arrived at suchness".

Another interpretation, proposed by the scholar Richard Gombrich, is based on the fact that, when used as a suffix in compounds, -gata will often lose its literal meaning and signifies instead "being". Tathāgata would thus mean "one like that", with no motion in either direction.

According to Fyodor Shcherbatskoy, the term has a non-Buddhist origin, and is best understood when compared to its usage in non-Buddhist works such as the Mahabharata. Shcherbatskoy gives the following example from the Mahabharata (Shantiparva, 181.22): "Just as the footprints of birds (flying) in the sky and fish (swimming) in water cannot be seen, Thus (tātha) is going (gati) of those who have realized the Truth."

The French author René Guénon, in an essay distinguishing between Pratyēka-Buddhas and Bodhisattvas, writes that the former appear outwardly superior to the latter, simply because they are allowed to remain impassible, whereas the latter must in some sense appear to rediscover "a way" or at least recapitulate it, so that others, too, may "go that way," hence tathā-gata.

== The nature of a Tathāgata ==
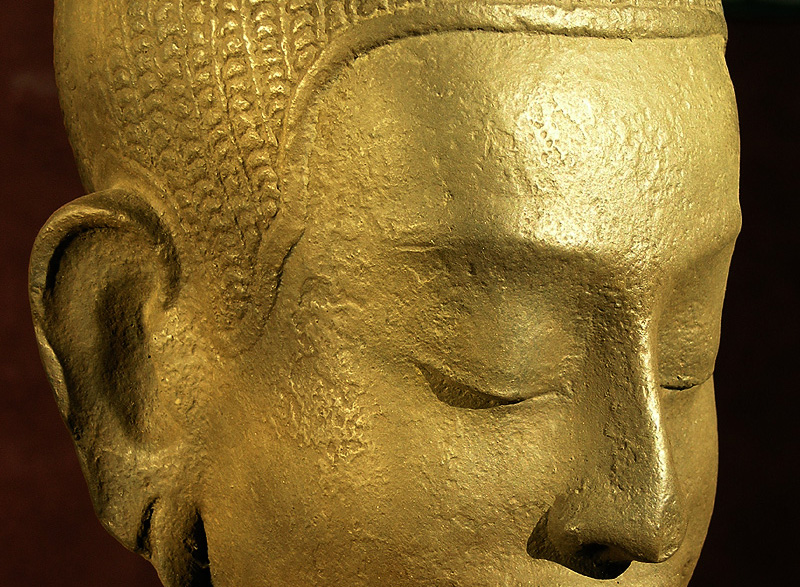
Beyond all coming and going: the Tathāgata

A number of passages affirm that a Tathāgata is "immeasurable", "inscrutable", "hard to fathom", and "not apprehended". A tathāgata has abandoned that clinging to the skandhas (personality factors) that render citta (the mind) a bounded, measurable entity, and is instead "freed from being reckoned by" all or any of them, even in life. The aggregates of form, feeling, perception, mental formations, and cognizance that compose personal identity have been seen to be dukkha (a burden), and an enlightened individual is one with "burden dropped".The Buddha explains "that for which a monk has a latent tendency, by that is he reckoned, what he does not have a latent tendency for, by that is he not reckoned. These tendencies are ways in which the mind becomes involved in and clings to conditioned phenomena. Without them, an enlightened person cannot be "reckoned" or "named"; he or she is beyond the range of other beings, and cannot be "found" by them, even by gods, or Mara. In one passage, Sariputta states that the mind of the Buddha cannot be "encompassed" even by him.

The Buddha and Sariputta, in similar passages, when confronted with speculation as to the status of an arahant after death, bring their interlocutors to admit that they cannot even apprehend an arahant that is alive. As Sariputta puts it, his questioner Yamaka "can't pin down the Tathagata as a truth or reality even in the present life." These passages imply that condition of the arahant, both before and after parinirvana, lies beyond the domain where the descriptive powers of ordinary language are at home; that is, the world of the skandhas and the greed, hatred, and delusion that are "blown out" with nirvana.

In the Aggi-Vacchagotta Sutta, an ascetic named Vaccha questions the Buddha on a variety of metaphysical issues. When Vaccha asks about the status of a tathagata after death, the Buddha asks him in which direction a fire goes when it has gone out. Vaccha replies that the question "does not fit the case ... For the fire that depended on fuel ... when that fuel has all gone, and it can get no other, being thus without nutriment, it is said to be extinct." The Buddha then explains: "In exactly the same way ..., all form by which one could predicate the existence of the saint, all that form has been abandoned, uprooted, pulled out of the ground like a palmyra-tree, and become non-existent and not liable to spring up again in the future. The saint ... who has been released from what is styled form is deep, immeasurable, unfathomable, like the mighty ocean." The same is then said of the other aggregates. A variety of similar passages make it clear that the metaphor "gone out, he cannot be defined" (atthangato so na pamanam eti) refers equally to liberation in life. In the Aggi-Vacchagotta Sutta itself, it is clear that the Buddha is the subject of the metaphor, and the Buddha has already "uprooted" or "annihilated" the five aggregates. In Sn 1074, it is stated that the sage cannot be "reckoned" because he is freed from the category "name" or, more generally, concepts. The absence of this precludes the possibility of reckoning or articulating a state of affairs; "name" here refers to the concepts or apperceptions that make propositions possible.

Nagarjuna expressed this understanding in the nirvana chapter of his Mulamadhyamakakarika: "It is not assumed that the Blessed One exists after death. Neither is it assumed that he does not exist, or both, or neither. It is not assumed that even a living Blessed One exists. Neither is it assumed that he does not exist, or both, or neither."

Speaking within the context of Mahayana Buddhism (specifically the Perfection of Wisdom sutras), Edward Conze writes that the term 'tathagata' denotes inherent true selfhood within the human being:

Just as tathata designates true reality in general, so the word which developed into "Tathagata" designated the true self, the true reality within man.

== Five Tathāgatas ==
In Vajrayana Buddhism, the Five Tathāgatas (pañcatathāgata) or Five Wisdom Tathāgatas (五智如来; 五智如來; Wǔzhì Rúlái), the Five Great Buddhas, and the Five Jinas (Sanskrit for "conqueror" or "victor"), are emanations and representations of the five qualities of the Adi-Buddha or "first Buddha" Vairocana or Vajradhara, which is associated with the Dharmakāya.

The Five Wisdom Buddhas are a development of the Buddhist Tantras, and later became associated with the trikaya or "three body" theory of Buddhahood. While in the Tattvasaṃgraha Tantra there are only four Buddha families, the full Diamond Realm mandala with five Buddhas first appears in the Vajrasekhara Sutra. The Vajrasekhara also mentions a sixth Buddha, Vajradhara, "a Buddha (or principle) seen as the source, in some sense, of the five Buddhas."

The Five Buddhas are aspects of the dharmakaya "dharma-body", which embodies the principle of enlightenment in Buddhism.

When these Buddhas are represented in mandalas, they may not always have the same colour or be related to the same directions. In particular, Akshobhya and Vairocana may be switched. When represented in a Vairocana mandala, the Buddhas are arranged like this:

	Amoghasiddhi (North)
Amitābha (West)	Vairocana (Principal deity/meditator)	Akshobhya (East)
	Ratnasambhava (South)

== The Seven Buddhas of Antiquity ==
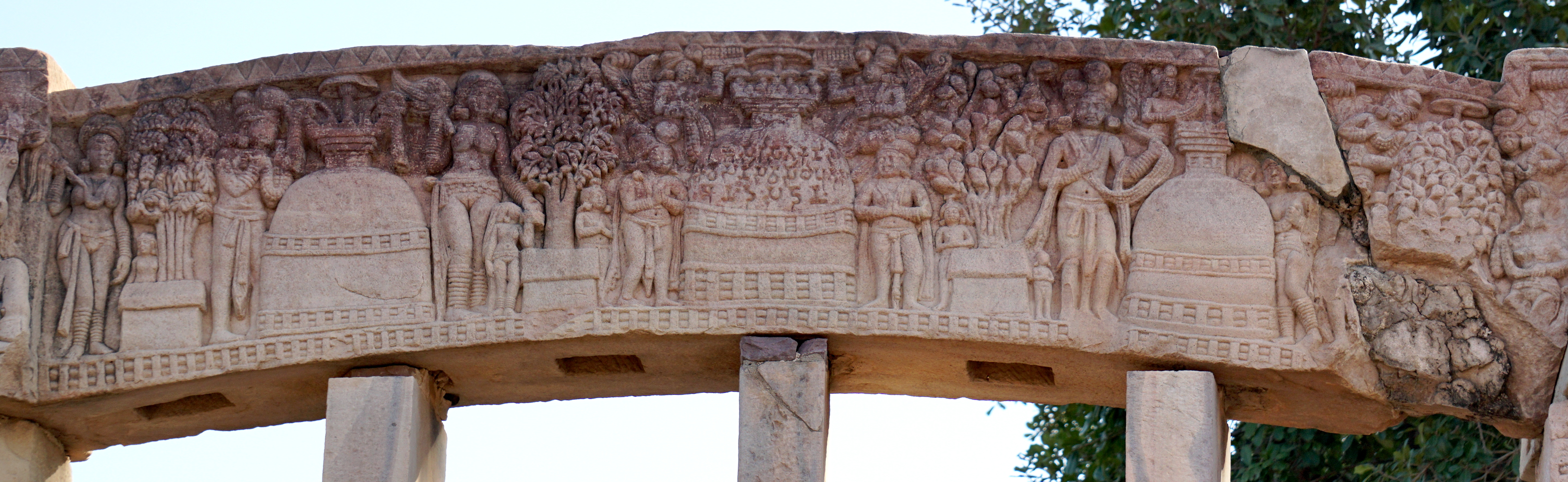
"The Seven Buddhas", at Sanchi (1st century BCE/CE). Six Buddhas of the past are represented, together with the current Buddha, Gautama Buddha, with his Bodhi Tree (at the extreme right). In the central section are three stupas alternating with four trees with thrones in front of them, adored by figures both human and divine. These represent six Buddhas of the past (viz. Vipassī Buddha, Sikhī Buddha, Vessabhū Buddha, Kakusandha Buddha, Koṇāgamana Buddha, and Kassapa Buddha). Three are symbolized by their stupas, and four by the trees under which each respectively attained enlightenment. The tree on the extreme right is the pipal tree of Gautama Buddha and the one next to it is the banyan tree of Kassapa Buddha. The identification of the others is less certain.

In the earliest strata of Pali Buddhist texts, especially in the first four Nikāyas, only the following seven Buddhas, the Seven Buddhas of Antiquity (Sattatathāgata, or "The Seven Tathāgatas"), are explicitly mentioned and named. Of these, four are from the current kappa (kalpa), and three are from past ones.

1. Vipassī (lived ninety-one kappas ago)
2. Sikhī (lived thirty-one kappas ago)
3. Vessabhū (lived thirty-one kappas ago in the same kappa as Sikhī)
4. Kakusandha (the first Buddha of the current bhaddakappa)
5. Koṇāgamana (the second Buddha of the current bhaddakappa)
6. Kassapa (the third Buddha of the current bhaddakappa)
7. Gotama (the fourth and present Buddha of the current bhaddakappa

One sutta called Cakkavatti-Sīhanāda Sutta from an early Buddhist text called the Dĩgha Nikãya also mentions that following the Seven Buddhas of Antiquity, a Buddha named Metteyya (Maitreya) is predicted to arise in the world.

However, according to a text in the Theravada Buddhist tradition from a later strata (between the 1st and 2nd century BCE) called the Buddhavaṃsa, twenty-one more Buddhas were added to the list of seven names in the early texts. Theravada tradition maintains that there can be up to five Buddhas in a kappa or world age and that the current kappa has had four Buddhas, with the current Buddha, Gotama, being the fourth and the future Buddha Metteyya being the fifth and final Buddha of the kappa. This would make the current aeon a bhaddakappa ("bhadrakalpa", fortunate aeon). In some Sanskrit and northern Buddhist traditions, however, a bhadrakalpa has up to 1,000 Buddhas, with the Buddhas Gautama and Maitreya also being the fourth and fifth Buddhas of the kalpa, respectively.

== See also ==
- Nyorai
- Nirvana
- Enlightenment (religious)
- Buddhism and Hinduism
- Buddhahood
- Sugata
- Tathagatagarbha
- Tathagatagarbha Sutra
- I Am that I Am
