= Passaddhi =

Buddhist philosophical concept

Passaddhi is a Pali noun (Sanskrit: prasrabhi, Tibetan: ཤིན་ཏུ་སྦྱང་བ་, Tibetan Wylie: shin tu sbyang ba) that has been translated as "calmness", "tranquillity", "repose" and "serenity." The associated verb is passambhati (to calm down, to be quiet).

In Buddhism, passaddhi refers to tranquillity of the body, speech, thoughts and consciousness on the path to enlightenment. As part of cultivated mental factors, passaddhi is preceded by rapture (pīti) and precedes concentration (samādhi).

Passaddhi is identified as a wholesome factor in the following canonical contexts:

- kāyapassaddhi is one of beautiful mental factors in Theravāda Abhidhamma tradition
- cittapassaddhi is one of beautiful mental factors in Theravāda Abhidhamma tradition
- the seven factors of enlightenment (sambojjhangas)
- meditative absorptions (jhanani)
- transcendental dependent arising (lokuttara-paticcasamuppada)

== Canonical references ==
In various Buddhist canonical schema, the calming of the body, speech and various mental factors is associated with gladness (pāmojja, pāmujja), rapture (pīti), and pleasure (sukhaṃ) and leads to the concentration needed for release from suffering.

=== Meditative calming ===
Calming (passambhayaṃ) bodily and mental formations is the culmination of each of the first two tetrads of meditation instructions in the Pali Canon's famed Anapanasati Sutta:

[1]	Breathing in long, he discerns, 'I am breathing in long'....	Dīghaṃ vā assasanto dīghaṃ assasāmīti pajānāti....
[2]	Or breathing in short, he discerns, 'I am breathing in short'....	Rassaṃ vā assasanto rassaṃ assasāmīti pajānāti....
[3]	He trains himself, 'I will breathe in sensitive to the entire body....'	Sabbakāyapaṭisaṃvedī assasissāmīti sikkhati....
[4]	He trains himself, 'I will breathe in calming bodily fabrication....'	Passambhayaṃ kāyasaṅkhāraṃ assasissāmīti sikkhati....
[5]	He trains himself, 'I will breathe in sensitive to rapture....'	Pītipaṭisaṃvedī assasissāmīti sikkhati....
[6]	He trains himself, 'I will breathe in sensitive to pleasure....'	Sukhapaṭisaṃvedī assasissāmīti sikkhati....
[7]	He trains himself, 'I will breathe in sensitive to mental fabrication....'	Cittasaṅkhārapaṭisaṃvedī assasissāmīti sikkhati....
[8]	He trains himself, 'I will breathe in calming mental fabrication....'	Passambhayaṃ cittasaṅkhāraṃ assasissāmīti sikkhati....

=== Sati, pāmojja, pīti, passaddhi, sukho ===
A number of discourses identify the concurrent arising of the following wholesome mental states with the development of mindfulness (sati) and the onset of the first jhana:

- pāmojja or pāmujja ("gladness" or "joy")
- pīti ("rapture" or "joy")
- passaddhi ("tranquility" or "serenity" or "calm")
- sukho ("happiness" or "pleasure").

By establishing mindfulness, one overcomes the Five Hindrances (pañca nīvaraṇi), gives rise to gladness, rapture, pleasure and tranquillizes the body (kāyo passambhati); such bodily tranquillity (passaddhakāyo) leads to higher states of concentration (samādhi) as indicated in this Pali-recorded discourse ascribed to the Buddha:

Seeing that [these five hindrances] have been abandoned within him, he becomes glad. Glad, he becomes enraptured. Enraptured, his body grows tranquil. His body tranquil, he is sensitive to pleasure. Feeling pleasure, his mind becomes concentrated.	Tassime pañca nīvaraṇe pahīṇe attani samanupassato pāmojjaṃ jāyati. Pamuditassa pīti jāyati. Pītimanassa kāyo passambhati. Passaddhakāyo sukhaṃ vedeti. Sukhino cittaṃ samādhiyati.

Alternately, with right effort and sense-restraint, paññā ("wisdom," "discernment") is fully realized, and the jhana-factors arise:

When defiling mental qualities are abandoned and bright mental qualities have grown, and one enters & remains in the culmination & abundance of discernment [paññā], having known & realized it for oneself in the here & now, there is joy, rapture, serenity [passaddhi], mindfulness, alertness, and a pleasant/happy abiding.	Saṅkilesikā ceva dhammā pahīyissanti. Vodāniyā dhammā abhivaḍḍhissanti. Paññāpāripūriṃ vepullattañca diṭṭheva dhamme sayaṃ abhiññā sacchikatvā upasampajja viharissanti. Pāmujjañceva bhavissati pīti ca passaddhi ca sati ca sampajaññañca sukho ca vihāro.

=== Enlightenment factor ===
Passaddhi is the fifth of seven factors of enlightenment (sambojjhanga) that lead to deliverance from suffering. Among the factors of enlightenment, serenity (passadhi) is preceded by rapture (pīti) and leads to concentration (samādhi) as further described by the Buddha in the Anapanasati Sutta:

"For one enraptured at heart, the body grows calm and the mind grows calm. When the body & mind of a monk enraptured at heart grow calm, then serenity as a factor for awakening becomes aroused. He develops it, and for him it goes to the culmination of its development.
"For one who is at ease — his body calmed — the mind becomes concentrated. When the mind of one who is at ease — his body calmed — becomes concentrated, then concentration as a factor for awakening becomes aroused. He develops it, and for him it goes to the culmination of its development."

=== Jhanic attainment ===
Table: Factors of rūpa jhāna
Cetasika (mental factors)	First jhāna	Second jhāna	Third jhāna	Fourth jhāna
Kāma / Akusala dhamma (sensuality / unskillful qualities)	secluded from; withdrawn	does not occur	does not occur	does not occur
Pīti (rapture)	seclusion-born; pervades body	samādhi-born; pervades body	fades away (along with distress)	does not occur
Sukha (non-sensual pleasure)	seclusion-born; pervades body	samādhi-born; pervades body	pervades physical body	abandoned (no pleasure nor pain)
Vitakka ("applied thought")	accompanies jhāna	unification of awareness free from vitakka and vicāra	does not occur	does not occur
Vicāra ("sustained thought")	accompanies jhāna	unification of awareness free from vitakka and vicāra	does not occur	does not occur
Upekkhāsatipārisuddhi (pure, mindful equanimity)	does not occur	internal confidence	equanimous; mindful	purity of equanimity and mindfulness

In describing one's progressive steps through the absorptions (jhanani), the Buddha identifies six sequential "calmings" (passaddhis):

1. With the first jhana, speech (vācā) is calmed.
2. With the second jhana, applied and sustained thought (vitakka-vicārā) is calmed.
3. With the third jhana, rapture (pīti) is calmed.
4. With the fourth jhana, in-and-out breathing (assāsa-passāsā) is calmed.
5. With the cessation of perception and feeling, perception and feeling (saññā-vedanā) are calmed.
6. With the ending of mental fermentations (āsava), lust, hatred and delusion (rāga-dosa-moha) are calmed.

=== Arahantship condition ===
Passaddhi is a "supporting condition" for the "destruction of the cankers" (āsava-khaye), that is, the achievement of Arahantship. More specifically, in describing a set of supporting conditions that move one from samsaric suffering (see Dependent Origination) to destruction of the cankers, the Buddha describes the following progression of conditions:

1. suffering (dukkha)
2. faith (saddhā)
3. joy (pāmojja, pāmujja)
4. rapture (pīti)
5. tranquillity (passaddhi)
6. happiness (sukha)
7. concentration (samādhi)
8. knowledge and vision of things as they are (yathābhūta-ñāna-dassana)
9. disenchantment with worldly life (nibbidā)
10. dispassion (virāga)
11. freedom, release, emancipation, deliverance (vimutti)
12. knowledge of destruction of the cankers (āsava-khaye-ñāna)

In the Pali literature, this sequence that enables one to transcend worldly suffering is referred to as the "transcendental dependent arising" (lokuttara-paticcasamuppada).

=== Abhidhammic wholesome state ===
In the Abhidhamma Pitaka's Dhammasangani, the first chapter identifies 56 states of material-world consciousness that are wholesome, including "lightness of sense and thought," upon which the text elaborates:

What on that occasion is repose of sense (kayāpassaddhi)?
The serenity, the composure which there is on that occasion, the calming, the tranquillizing, the tranquillity of the skandhas of feeling, perception and syntheses — this is the serenity of sense that there then is.
What on that occasion is serenity of thought (cittapassaddhi)?
The serenity, the composure which there is on that occasion, the calming, the tranquillizing, the tranquillity of the skandha of intellect — this is the serenity of thought that there then is.

== Post-canonical Pali texts ==
Passaddhi is referenced in the Visuddhimagga and other Pali commentarial (atthakatha) texts.

=== Tranquillity's nutriments ===
In the Visuddhimagga, the enlightenment factors (bojjhangas) are discussed in the context of skills for developing absorption (jhāna). In particular, the Visuddhimagga recommends that in order to develop the skill of "restrain[ing] the mind on an occasion when it should be restrained" (such as when it is "agitated through over-energeticness, etc."), one should develop tranquillity (passaddhi), concentration (samādhi) and equanimity (upekkhā). Towards this end, the Visuddhimagga identifies seven things from which bodily and mental tranquillity arise:

1. "using superior food"
2. "living in a good climate"
3. "maintaining a pleasant posture"
4. "keeping to the middle"
5. "avoidance of violent persons"
6. "cultivation of persons tranquil in body"
7. "resoluteness upon that [tranquillity]."

== See also ==
- Jhana (Meditative absorption)
- Paticcasamuppada (Dependent Origination)
  - Twelve Nidanas (12 Causes)
- Samatha
- Seven factors of enlightenment
- Bodhipakkhiya dhamma (Qualities conducive to Enlightenment)
- Pāramī (Perfections)
  - Pañña (wisdom)
  - Sacca (truth)
  - Adhiṭṭhāna (resolute determination)
  - Dāna (generosity)
  - Nekkhamma (renunciation)
  - Upekkhā (equanimity)
  - Khanti (patience)
  - Metta (loving-kindness)
  - Vīrya (diligence)

== Sources ==
- Bodhi, Bhikkhu (trans., ed.) (1980). Transcendental Dependent Arising: A Translation and Exposition of the Upanisa Sutta (The Wheel No. 277/278) (SN 12.23) Kandy: Buddhist Publication Society. Retrieved 11 Jul 2007 from "Access to Insight" (1995) at http://www.accesstoinsight.org/lib/authors/bodhi/wheel277.html.
- Buddhaghosa, Bhadantacariya & Bhikkhu Ñāṇamoli (trans.) (1999). The Path of Purification: Visuddhimagga. Seattle, WA: BPS Pariyatti Editions. ISBN 1-928706-00-2.
- Nyanaponika Thera (trans.) (1983, 1998). Rahogata Sutta: Secluded (SN 36.11). Retrieved 09 Jul 2007 from "Access to Insight" at http://www.accesstoinsight.org/tipitaka/sn/sn36/sn36.011.nypo.html.
- Rhys Davids, C.A.F. (trans.) (1900). A Buddhist manual of psychological ethics or Buddhist Psychology, of the Fourth Century B.C., being a translation, now made for the first time, from the Original Pāli of the First Book in the Abhidhamma-Piţaka, entitled Dhamma-Sangaṇi (Compendium of States or Phenomena). Lancaster: Pali Text Society. Reprint currently available from Kessinger Publishing. ISBN 0-7661-4702-9.
- Rhys Davids, T.W. & William Stede (eds.) (1921-5). The Pali Text Society's Pali–English Dictionary. Chipstead: Pali Text Society. A general on-line search engine for this dictionary is available at http://dsal.uchicago.edu/dictionaries/pali/.
- Sri Lanka Buddha Jayanti Tipitaka Series (SLTP) (n.d.-a). Ānāpānasatisuttaṃ (in Pali) (MN 118). Retrieved 13 Jul 2007 from "Mettanet - Lanka" at http://www.metta.lk/tipitaka/2Sutta-Pitaka/2Majjhima-Nikaya/Majjhima3/118-anappanasati-p.html.
- Sri Lanka Buddha Jayanti Tipitaka Series (SLTP) (n.d.-b). Sāmaññaphalasuttaṃ (in Pali) (DN 9). Retrieved 14 Jul 2007 from "Mettanet - Lanka" at http://www.metta.lk/tipitaka/2Sutta-Pitaka/1Digha-Nikaya/Digha1/09-potthapada-p.html.
- Sri Lanka Buddha Jayanti Tipitaka Series (SLTP) (n.d.-c). Sāmaññaphalasuttaṃ (in Pali) (DN 2). Retrieved 14 Jul 2007 from "Mettanet - Lanka" at http://www.metta.lk/tipitaka/2Sutta-Pitaka/1Digha-Nikaya/Digha1/02samannaphala-p.html.
- Thanissaro Bhikkhu (trans.) (1997). Samaññaphala Sutta: The Fruits of the Contemplative Life (DN 2). Retrieved 14 Jul 2007 from "Access to Insight" at http://www.accesstoinsight.org/tipitaka/dn/dn.02.0.than.html.
- Thanissaro Bhikkhu (trans.) (1998). Rahogata Sutta: Alone (SN 36.11). Retrieved 09 Jul 2007 from "Access to Insight" at http://www.accesstoinsight.org/tipitaka/sn/sn36/sn36.011.than.html.
- Thanissaro Bhikkhu (trans.) (2003). Potthapada Sutta: About Potthapada (DN 9). Retrieved 14 Jul 2007 from "Access to Insight" at http://www.accesstoinsight.org/tipitaka/dn/dn.09.0.than.html.
- Thanissaro Bhikkhu (trans.) (2006). Anapanasati Sutta: Mindfulness of Breathing (MN 118). Retrieved 09 Jul 2007 from "Access to Insight" at http://www.accesstoinsight.org/tipitaka/mn/mn.118.than.html.
- Upalavanna, Sister (n.d.). Aṅguttara Nikāya, [Navakanipāta], 006. Khemavaggo – Section on Appeasement (AN 9.6). Retrieved 10 Jul 2007 from "Mettanet - Lanka" at http://www.metta.lk/tipitaka/2Sutta-Pitaka/4Anguttara-Nikaya/Anguttara6/09-navakanipata/006-khemavaggo-e.html.
