= List of West Zone women's cricketers =

This is a list of all cricketers who have played first-class or List A cricket for West Zone women's cricket team.

== A - D ==
- Nandita Adhiya
- Ritika Bhopalkar
- Shraddha Chavan
- Neha Chavda
- Reena Dabhi
- Soniya Dabir
- Manali Dakshini
- Nancy Daruwalla
- Shweta Dave
- Anagha Deshpande

== G - K ==
- Priyanka Garkhede
- Gauri Gokhale
- Rajeshwari Goyal
- Tejal Hasabnis
- Jayshreeba Jadeja
- Mridula Jadeja
- Snehal Jadhav
- Shweta Jadhav
- Shweta Dave
- MV Joshi
- SS Kadam
- HY Kazi
- TV Khot
- AP Kokil
- SM Koli

== L - P ==
- Samantha Lobatto
- BK Makhania
- Smriti Mandhana
- SR Mane
- Sulakshana Naik
- Devika Palshikar
- PR Panchal
- Sunetra Paranjpe
- DR Patel
- HA Patel
- NY Patel
- PA Patel
- TN Pathan
- AA Patil
- KD Patil
- PD Pawale
- Snehal Pradhan
- Seema Pujare

== R - Y ==
- Poonam Raut
- JI Rodriques
- SG Rozario
- SV Sakru
- ND Shahi
- Amrita Shinde
- SS Shinde
- Monica Sumra
- BD Surti
- LJ Tomar
- Devika Vaidya
- RP Yadav
