= Sukha =

Concept of good (sweet) water (life) in India

Translations of Sukha
- English: Happiness, ease, or bliss
- Chinese: 樂 (佛教) (Pinyin: Lè)
- Japanese: 樂 (仏教) (Rōmaji: Raku)
- Khmer: សុខ (UNGEGN: Sŏkh)
- Korean: 악 (불교) (RR: Ak)
- Thai: สุขา, IPA: [sukha]
- Vietnamese: Hạnh phúc

Sukha (Pali and Sanskrit: सुख) means happiness, pleasure, ease, joy or bliss. Among the early scriptures, 'sukha' is set up as a contrast to 'preya' (प्रेय) meaning a transient pleasure, whereas the pleasure of 'sukha' has an authentic state of happiness within a being that is lasting. In the Pāli Canon, the term is used in the context of describing laic pursuits and meditation.

== Etymology ==
According to Monier-Williams (1964), the etymology of sukha is "said to be su ['good'] + kha ['aperture'] and to mean originally 'having a good axle-hole'"; thus, for instance, in the Rig Veda sukha denotes "running swiftly or easily" (applied, e.g., to chariots). Monier-Williams also notes that the term might derive alternatively as "possibly a Prākrit form of su-stha, q.v.; cf. duḥkha", literally meaning su ['good'] + stha ['standing'].

According to Jacobi, sukha may have developed from suṣṭha, "standing well". Likewise, according to Monier Monier-Williams, the actual roots of the Pali term dukkha appear to be Sanskrit दुस्- (dus-, "bad") + स्था (sthā, "to stand"). (Note: Monier-Williams 1899, p. 483, entry note: : "according to grammarians properly written dush-kha and said to be from duḥ- and kha [cf. su-khá]; but more probably a Prākritized form for duḥ-sthā, q.v.") Irregular phonological changes in the development of Sanskrit into the various Prakrits led to a shift from dus-sthā to duḥkha to dukkha. Bhikkhu Anālayo concurs, stating that dukkha as derived from duḥ-sthā, "standing badly", "conveys nuances of "uneasiness" or of being "uncomfortable". According to Jonathan C. Gold "duḥkha means precarity, instability, an unreliable place to stand", referring to "bumpiness, instability, and uncertainty—not a good ride, not a safe place to stand, being unreliable.

Sukha is juxtaposed with duḥkha (Sanskrit; Pali: dukkha; often translated as "suffering"), which were established as the major motivating life principles in early Vedic religion. This theme of the centrality of dukkha was developed in later years in both Vedic and Buddhist traditions. Therefore, the elimination of dukkha is the raison d'être of early Buddhism.

== Pali literature ==
In the Pali Canon and related literature, the term is used in a general sense to refer to "well-being and happiness" (hitasukha) in either this present life or future lives. In addition, it is a technical term associated with describing a factor of meditative absorption (jhāna) and a sensory-derived feeling (vedanā).

=== General life pursuit ===
In the Pāli Canon, the Buddha discusses with different lay persons "well-being and happiness" (hitasukha) "visible in this present life" (diṭṭha-dhamma) and "pertaining to the future life" (samparāyika), as exemplified by the following suttas.

==== Anana Sutta ====
In the Anaṇa Sutta (AN 4.62), the Buddha describes four types of happiness for a "householder partaking of sensuality" (gihinā kāma-bhoginā):

- the happiness of earning (atthi-sukha) wealth by just and righteous means
- the happiness of using (bhoga-sukha) wealth liberally on family, friends, & on meritorious deeds
- the happiness of debtlessness (anaṇa-sukha) be free from debts
- the happiness of blamelessness (anavajja-sukha), to live a faultless and pure life without committing evil in thought, word, and deed

Of these, the wise (sumedhaso) know that the happiness of blamelessness is by far the greatest householder happiness. Economic and material happiness is not worth one sixteenth part of the spiritual happiness arising out of a faultless and good life.

==== Kalama Sutta ====
In the Kālāmā Sutta (AN 3.65), townspeople ask the Buddha how they are to ascertain which spiritual teaching is true. The Buddha counsels that one should "enter and dwell" (upasampajja vihareyyātha) in "things" or "qualities" (dhammā) that are:

- skillful (kusalā),
- blameless (anavajjā),
- praised by the wise (viññuppasatthā), and
- when put into practice, are conducive to well-being and happiness (samattā samādinnā hitāya sukhāya saṃvattantī)

Using the latter criterion, the Buddha then asks the townspeople to assess greed (lobha), hate (dosa) and delusion (moha) whereby it is agreed that entering and dwelling in non-greed, non-hate and non-delusion lead to well-being and happiness. The Buddha states that, given this understanding, a noble disciple (ariyasāvako) pervades all directions with lovingkindness, compassion, sympathetic joy and equanimity (see the four brahmaviharas); and, by doing so, one purifies oneself, avoids evil-induced consequences, lives a happy present life and, if there is a future karmic rebirth, one will be born in a heavenly world.

==== Dighajanu Sutta ====
In the Dighajānu Sutta (AN 8.54), Dighajānu approaches the Buddha and states:

"We are lay people enjoying sensuality; living crowded with spouses & children; using Kasi fabrics & sandalwood; wearing garlands, scents, & creams; handling gold & silver. May the Blessed One teach the Dhamma for those like us, for our happiness & well-being in this life, for our happiness & well-being in lives to come."

In a manner somewhat similar to his exposition in the aforementioned Anaṇa Sutta, the Buddha identifies four sources that lead to well-being and happiness in the current life:

- productive efforts (uṭṭhāna-sampadā) in one's livelihood,
- protective efforts (ārakkha-sampadā) regarding ones wealth in terms of possible theft or disaster,
- virtuous friendship (kalyāṇa-mittatā), and
- even-headed living (sama-jīvikatā), abstaining from womanizing, drunkenness, gambling and evil friendships.

In terms of well-being and happiness in the next life, the Buddha identifies the following sources:

- faith (saddhā) in the fully enlightened Buddha;
- virtue (sīla), as exemplified by the Five Precepts;
- generosity (cāga), giving charity and alms; and,
- wisdom (paññā), having insight into the arising and passing of things.

==== Mettā practice ====
As indicated above, in the Kālāmā Sutta, the Buddha identifies the practice of the four divine abodes (brahmavihara) as being conducive to one's own well-being and happiness. The first of these abodes is mettā (benevolence, kindness), which is, for instance, classically expressed in the Pali canon's Karaniya Mettā Sutta ("Scripture of Compassionate Benevolence") (Sn 1.8) by the sincere wish (in English and Pali):

May all beings be at ease!	Sabbe sattā bhavantu sukhitattā.

Similarly, the Pali commentaries (SN-A 128) explicitly define mettā as "the desire to bring about the well-being and happiness [of others]" (hita-sukha-upanaya-kāmatā) Thus, in Buddhism, to dwell wishing for others' general happiness is conducive to the development of one's own happiness.

=== Feeling attribute ===
In the Buddhist frameworks of the five aggregates (Sanskrit: skandha; Pali: khandha) and dependent origination (Sanskrit: pratītyasamutpāda; Pali: paticcasamuppāda), "feelings" or "sensations" (vedanā) arise from the contact of an external object (such as a visual object or sound) with a sensory organ (such as the eye or ear) and consciousness. In the Pali Canon, such feelings are generally described to be of one of three types: pleasant (sukha), unpleasant (dukkha), or neither-unpleasant-nor-pleasant (adukkha-asukha).

=== Mental factor in meditation ===
Table: Factors of rūpa jhāna
Cetasika (mental factors)	First jhāna	Second jhāna	Third jhāna	Fourth jhāna
Kāma / Akusala dhamma (sensuality / unskillful qualities)	secluded from; withdrawn	does not occur	does not occur	does not occur
Pīti (rapture)	seclusion-born; pervades body	samādhi-born; pervades body	fades away (along with distress)	does not occur
Sukha (non-sensual pleasure)	seclusion-born; pervades body	samādhi-born; pervades body	pervades physical body	abandoned (no pleasure nor pain)
Vitakka ("applied thought")	accompanies jhāna	unification of awareness free from vitakka and vicāra	does not occur	does not occur
Vicāra ("sustained thought")	accompanies jhāna	unification of awareness free from vitakka and vicāra	does not occur	does not occur
Upekkhāsatipārisuddhi (pure, mindful equanimity)	does not occur	internal confidence	equanimous; mindful	purity of equanimity and mindfulness

In the commentarial tradition on Buddhist meditation, the development of jhāna (Sanskrit: dhyāna) is described as the development of five mental factors (Sanskrit: caitasika; Pali: cetasika) that counteract the five hindrances: (Note: See, for instance, Samādhaṅga Sutta (a/k/a, Pañcaṅgikasamādhi Sutta, AN 5.28) (Thanissaro, 1997b).)

1. vitakka ("applied thought") counteracts sloth and torpor (lethargy and drowsiness)
2. vicāra ("sustained thought") counteracts doubt (uncertainty)
3. pīti (rapture) counteracts ill-will (malice)
4. sukha ("non-sensual pleasure") counteracts restlessness-worry (excitation and anxiety)
5. ekaggata (one-pointedness) counteracts sensory desire

Both pīti and sukha are born of bodily seclusion and mental quietude in first jhāna, but both are then born of focused concentration (samādhi) in the second jhāna and only sukha is sustained in the third jhāna until it is abandoned for pure, mindful equanimity (upekkhāsatipārisuddhi) in the fourth jhāna.

The Visuddhimagga distinguishes between pīti and sukha in the following experiential manner:

And wherever the two are associated, happiness [here, Ñāṇamoli's translation of pīti] is the contentedness at getting a desirable object, and bliss [sukha] is the actual experiencing of it when got. Where there is happiness [pīti] there is bliss (pleasure) [sukha]; but where there is bliss [sukha] there is not necessarily happiness [pīti]. Happiness is included in the formations aggregate; bliss is included in the feeling aggregate. If a man exhausted in a desert saw or heard about a pond on the edge of a wood, he would have happiness; if he went into the wood's shade and used the water, he would have bliss....

Providing a bare-bones conditional chain of events that overlaps the above more narrative exposition, the Upanisa Sutta (SN 12.23) states that sukha arises from tranquillity (passaddhi) of the body and mind, and in turn gives rise to concentration (samādhi). Citing traditional post-canonical Pali literature related to this discourse, Bodhi (1980) adds the following functional definition of sukha:

The subcommentary to the Upanisa Sutta explains sukha as the happiness of the access to absorption. The term 'access' (upacara) denotes the stage in the cultivation of serenity immediately preceding full absorption, the intended goal of serenity meditation. Access is characterized by the abandonment of the five hindrances and the arising of the 'counterpart sign,' the self-luminous object of interior perception which is the focal point for the higher stages of concentration.

=== As a characterization of awakening ===
Nibbāna (Sanskrit: Nirvāṇa) entails the foundational extinction or "blowing out" of the processes of unwholesome desire, aversion, and delusion. From the perspective of awakened experience, the latter deleterious processes are appreciated as "agitations" of the mind. In comparative contrast to such agitation, sukha and its cognates are at places in the Pali Canon used to characterize the calm of Nibbāna, the "Unconditioned," as a bliss:

The born, come-to-be, produced,
The made, the conditioned, the transient,
Conjoined with decay and death,
A nest of disease, perishable,
Sprung from nutriment and craving's cord —
That is not fit to take delight in.

The escape from that, the peaceful,
Beyond reasoning, everlasting,
The not-born, the unproduced,
The sorrowless state that is void of stain,
The cessation of states linked to suffering,
The stilling of the conditioned — bliss.

Furthermore, regarding the meaning of sukha in the context of Nibbāna, Lily de Silva explains as follows:

Regarding the experience of the arahat, the Sutta Nipāta [in the Dvayatānupassanā Sutta, Snp 3.12] states that by the destruction of all feelings/sensations (vedanā), a bhikkhu lives desireless and at peace. Once Sāriputta was asked [in the Nibbānasukhasutta, AN 9.34] what happiness there can be when there is no feeling/sensation. He explained that the absence of feeling/sensation itself is happiness. It is relevant to note here that the Buddha says that he does not speak of happiness only with [specific] reference to pleasant feelings/sensations (sukhavedanā).

== Sanskrit literature ==
In Bhagavad Gita verses 6.21-23, the term 'sukha' is used to define the boundless happiness that characterizes yoga. It states that when the yogi attains this happiness, understood by the discriminative faculty (buddhi) but beyond the senses, he becomes firmly established in this state, free from suffering, and does not waver from it, a state known as yoga.

The Taittiriya Upanishad figuratively quantifies the bliss of Brahman, starting with the bliss of humans:

"Let us take a young man - a first class young man who is the most learned, cultured and strong person. And let us suppose that he owns this whole world with all its resources. This situation would constitute one measure of human bliss. A single measure of the bliss of earthly gandharva celestials ...equals one hundred measures of human bliss; a single measure of the bliss of celestial gandharvas ...equals one hundred measures of the bliss of earthly gandharvas; ...equals one hundred measures of bliss of the forefathers; a single measure of bliss of the gods who attained their status by good deeds …equals one hundred measures of the bliss of Indra; a single measure of the bliss of Prajapati, the progenitor of species, ...equals one hundred measures of the bliss of Brhaspati; a single measure of the bliss of Brahman equals one hundred measures of the bliss of Prajapati."

— Taittiriya Upanishad, Verse II.8

In the Yoga Sūtras, Patañjali uses the term 'sukha' in verse II.46, where he defines asana as the balance between "sukha" and "sthira" (strength, steadiness, firmness). In Sutra I.33, sukha refers to those who are happy, and suggests fostering friendship towards them to promote mental lucidity.

In Tattvartha Sutra, Jain scholar Umaswati explains the concept of sukha in context of spiritual liberation from karma. Umaswati explains four different meanings of sukha: as the quality of objects, as freedom from pain, as happiness resulting from meritorious actions, and as the ultimate sukha in the state of liberation (moksha).

== Neuro-scientific basis ==
Some researchers have proposed that a "shift" in the activity of the medial prefrontal cortex is what supports a state of inner fulfillment and equanimity.

== See also ==
- Brahmavihara (divine abodes: lovingkindness, compassion, sympathetic joy, and equanimity)
- Dependent Origination
- Jhāna (absorption)
- Dukkha (suffering)
- Householder (Buddhism)
- Kilesa (defilements; such as greed, hate, and delusion)
- Pīti (Joy)
- Khandas (aggregates)
- Sukhavati
- Vedanā (feeling)

== Sources ==
- Analayo (2013), Satipatthana. The Direct Path to Realization (PDF), Windhorse Publications
- Bryant, Edwin F. (2009). The Yoga Sutras of Patanjali: A New Edition, Translation, and Commentary with Insights from the Traditional Commentators. North Point Press. p. 183. ISBN 978-0-86547-736-0.
- Gold, Jonathan C. (2023). "Pyrrho's Buddha on Duḥkha and the Liberation from Views". Journal of the American Academy of Religion, Volume 91, Issue 3, September 2023, Pages 655–679.
- Monier-Williams, Monier (1899), A Sanskrit-English Dictionary (PDF), London: Oxford University Press
