= Nandita (given name) =

Nandita

Nandita or Nanditha is a North Indian feminine given name

== Notable people ==
- Nanditha (born 1978), Indian singer
- Nandita Adhiya, Indian cricketer
- Nandita Behera, Indian classical dancer
- Nandita Berry, (born 1968), Indian American attorney
- Nandita Basu, Indian-born American environmental engineer
- Nanditha Bose, Indian actress
- Nandita Chandra, Indian actress
- Nandita Das (born 1969), Indian actress and director
- Nandita K.C., Nepali actress
- Nanditha K. S., Indian poet
- Nanditha Jennifer, Indian actress
- Nanditha Krishna, Indian author and activist
- Nandita Kumar (born 1981), Indian artist
- Nandita Mahtani, Indian fashion designer
- Nanditha Raj, Indian actress
- Nandita Roy (born 1955), Indian filmmaker and screenwriter
- Nandita Saha, Indian table tennis player
- Nandita Swetha, Indian film actress
