= Shraddha =

Shraddha may refer to:

== In religion ==
- Śrāddha, a Hindu ritual performed for one's deceased ancestors
- Śraddhā, the Sanskrit term used to refer to faith in Buddhism, faith in Hinduism

== Given name ==
- Shraddha Arya (born 1987), Indian actress
- Shraddha Chavan (born 1988), Maharashtrian cricketer
- Shraddha Dangar (born 1994), Indian actress
- Shraddha Das (born 1987), Indian actress
- Shraddha Jadhav (born c.1964), Indian politician, mayor of Mumbai 2009–2012
- Shraddha Kapoor (born 1987), Indian actress
- Shraddha Musale (born 1984), Indian actress
- Shraddha Nigam (born 1979), Indian actress
- Shraddha Pandit (born 1982), Indian playback singer
- Shraddha Ram, Hindu missionary
- Shraddha Sharma (born 1995), Indian singer
- Shraddha Shashidhar (born 1996), Indian beauty pageant winner
- Shraddha Srinath (born 1990), Indian film actress

== Other uses ==
- Shraddha (TV series), an Indian soap opera, on air from 2009 to 2010
- Shraddha TV, a Sri Lankan television station with Buddhist content
- Shraddha Rehabilitation Foundation, an Indian non-profit organization
