= Dhyana in Buddhism =

Training of the mind through meditation in Buddhism

Dhyāna

Chinese name
- Traditional Chinese: 禪
- Simplified Chinese: 禅
Transcriptions
Standard Mandarin
- Hanyu Pinyin: Chán
- Wade–Giles: Ch’an
Yue: Cantonese
- Jyutping: sim^{4}

Tibetan name
- Tibetan: བསམ་གཏན
Transcriptions
- Wylie: bsam gtan

Vietnamese name
- Vietnamese alphabet: Thiền
- Hán-Nôm: 禪

Korean name
- Hangul: 선
- Hanja: 禪
Transcriptions
- Revised Romanization: Seon
- McCune–Reischauer: Sŏn

Japanese name
- Kanji: 禅定 or 静慮
Transcriptions
- Romanization: Zenjyō or Jyōryo

Filipino name
- Tagalog: Dhyana

Sanskrit name
- Sanskrit: ध्यान (in Devanagari); Dhyāna (Romanised)

Pāli name
- Pāli: 𑀛𑀸𑀦 (in Brāhmī) ඣාන (in Sinhala) ឈាន/ធ្យាន (in Khmer) ဈာန် (in Burmese) ၛာန် (in Mon); Jhāna (Romanised) ฌาน (in Thai)

In the oldest texts of Buddhism, dhyāna (Sanskrit: ध्यान) or jhāna (Pāli) is a component of the training of the mind (bhāvanā), commonly translated as meditation, to withdraw the mind from the automatic responses to sense-impressions and "burn up" the defilements, leading to a "state of perfect equanimity and awareness (upekkhā-sati-parisuddhi)." Dhyāna may have been the core practice of pre-sectarian Buddhism, in combination with several related practices which together lead to perfected mindfulness and detachment.

In the later commentarial tradition, which has survived in present-day Theravāda, dhyāna is equated with "concentration", a state of one-pointed absorption in which there is a diminished awareness of the surroundings. In the contemporary Theravāda-based Vipassana movement, this absorbed state of mind is regarded as unnecessary and even non-beneficial for the first stage of awakening, which has to be reached by mindfulness of the body and vipassanā (insight into impermanence). Since the 1980s, scholars and practitioners have started to question these positions, arguing for a more comprehensive and integrated understanding and approach, based on the oldest descriptions of dhyāna in the suttas.

In Buddhist traditions of Chan and Zen (the names of which are, respectively, the Chinese and Japanese pronunciations of dhyāna), as in Theravada and Tiantai, anapanasati (mindfulness of breathing), which is transmitted in the Buddhist tradition as a means to develop dhyana, is a central practice. In the Chan/Zen-tradition this practice is ultimately based on Sarvastivāda meditation techniques transmitted since the beginning of the Common Era.

== Etymology ==
Dhyāna, Pali jhana, from Proto-Indo-European root *√dheie-, "to see, to look", "to show". Developed into Sanskrit root √dhī and n. dhī, which in the earliest layer of text of the Vedas refers to "imaginative vision" and associated with goddess Saraswati with powers of knowledge, wisdom and poetic eloquence. This term developed into the variant √dhyā, "to contemplate, meditate, think", from which dhyāna is derived.

According to Buddhaghosa (5th century CE Theravāda exegete), the term jhāna (Skt. dhyāna) is derived from the verb jhayati, "to think or meditate", while the verb jhapeti, "to burn up", explicates its function, namely burning up opposing states, burning up or destroying "the mental defilements preventing [...] the development of serenity and insight." (Note: Bronkhorst and Wynne, among others, have discussed the influence of Vedic and Jain thought and practices on Buddhism. The "burning up" of defilements by means of austerities is a typical Jain practice, which was rejected by the Buddha.)

Commonly translated as meditation, and often equated with "concentration", though meditation may refer to a wider scale of exercises for bhāvanā, development. Dhyāna can also mean "attention, thought, reflection".

Zoroastrianism in Persia, which has Indo-Iranian linguistic and cultural roots, developed the related practice of daena.

== The jhāna/dhyana-stages ==
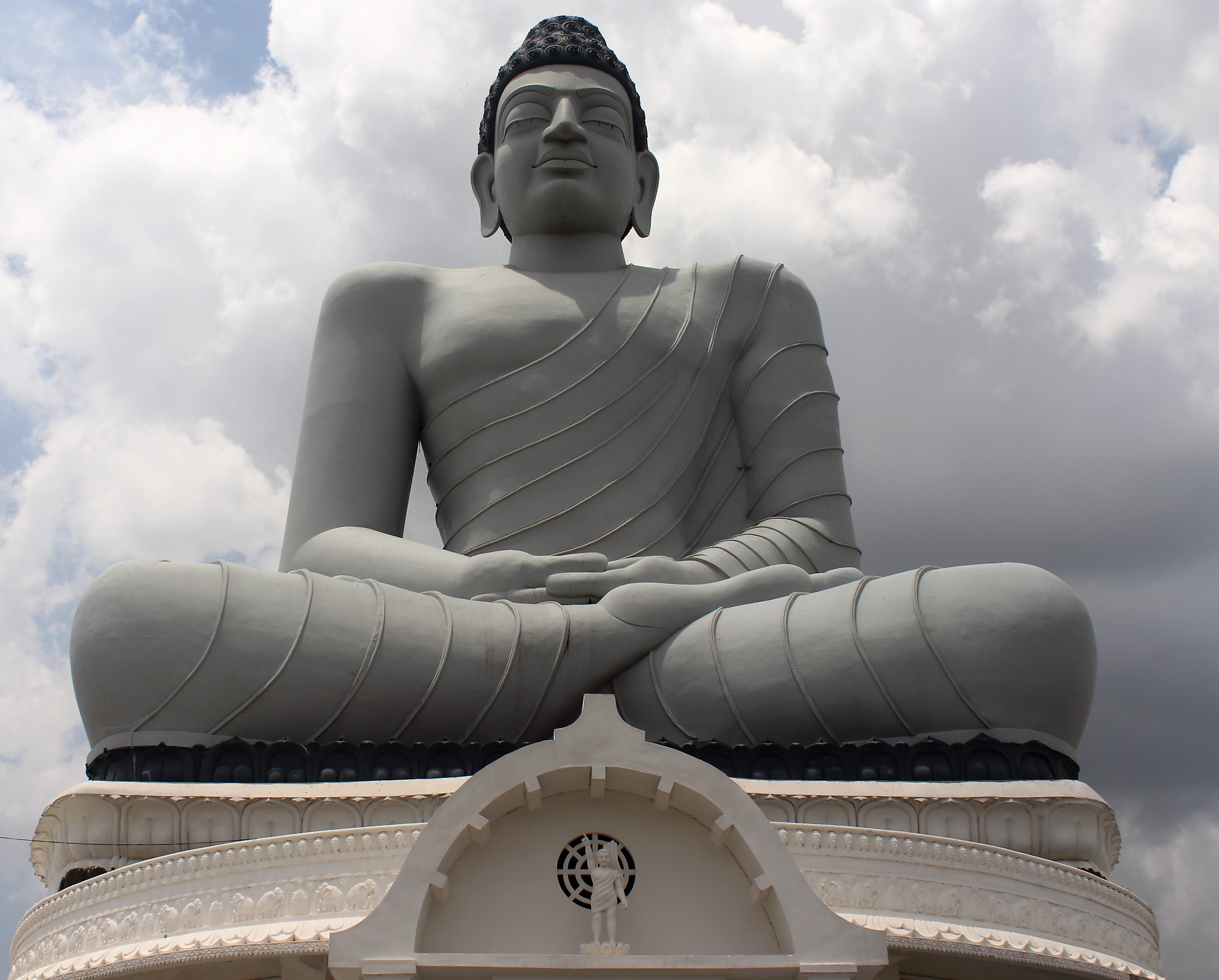
Buddha depicted in dhyāna, Amaravati, India

The Pāḷi Canon describes four progressive states of jhāna called rūpa jhāna ("form jhāna"), (Note: Though rūpa may also refer to the body. Arbel (2017) refers to the jhana as psycho-somatic experiences.) and four additional meditative attainments called arūpa ("without form").

=== Integrated set of practices ===
Meditation and contemplation form an integrated set of practices with several other practices, which are fully realized with the onset of dhyāna. As described in the Noble Eightfold Path, right view leads to leaving the household life and becoming a wandering monk. Sīla (morality) comprises the rules for right conduct. Right effort, or the four right efforts, which already contains elements of dhyāna, (Note: Shankman 2008, p. 15 quotes to MN 117.14, Mahācattārīsakasutta: “And what, bhikkhus, is right intention that is noble, taintless, supramundane, a factor of the path? The thinking, thought, intention, mental absorption, mental fixity, directing of mind, verbal formation in one whose mind is noble, whose mind is taintless, who possesses the noble path and is developing the noble path: this is right intention that is noble…a factor of the path.") aim to prevent the arising of unwholesome states, and to generate wholesome states. This includes indriya samvara (sense restraint), controlling the response to sensual perceptions, not giving in to lust and aversion but simply noticing the objects of perception as they appear. Right effort and mindfulness ("to remember to observe"), notably mindfulness of breathing, calm the mind-body complex, releasing unwholesome states and habitual patterns, and encouraging the development of wholesome states and non-automatic responses. By following these cumulative steps and practices, the mind becomes set, almost naturally, for the equanimity of dhyāna, (Note: Polak refers to Vetter, who noted that in the suttas right effort leads to a calm state of mind. When this calm and self-restraint had been reached, the Buddha is described as sitting down and attaining the first jhana, in an almost natural way.) reinforcing the development of wholesome states, which in return further reinforces equanimity and mindfulness.

=== The rūpa jhānas ===
In the sutras, jhāna is entered when one 'sits down cross-legged and establishes mindfulness'. According to Buddhist tradition, it may be supported by ānāpānasati, mindfulness of breathing, a core meditative practice which can be found in almost all schools of Buddhism. The Suttapiṭaka and the Agamas describe four stages of rūpa jhāna. Rūpa refers to the material realm, in a neutral stance, as different from the kāma-realm (lust, desire) and the arūpa-realm (non-material realm). While interpreted in the Theravada-tradition as describing a deepening concentration and one-pointedness, originally the jhānas seem to describe a development from investigating body and mind and abandoning unwholesome states, to perfected equanimity and watchfulness, an understanding which is retained in Zen and Dzogchen. The stock description of the jhānas, with traditional and alternative interpretations, is as follows: (Note: Keren Arbel refers to Majjhima Nikaya 26, Ariyapariyesana Sutta, The Noble Search See also: * Majjhima Nikaya 111, Anuppada Sutta * AN 05.028, Samadhanga Sutta: The Factors of Concentration. See Johansson (1981), Pali Buddhist texts Explained to Beginners for a word-by-word translation.)

1. First jhāna:
  Separated (vivicceva) from desire for sensual pleasures, separated (vivicca) from [other] unwholesome states (akusalehi dhammehi, unwholesome dhammas), a bhikkhu enters upon and abides in the first jhana, which is [mental] pīti ("rapture," "joy") and [bodily] sukha ("pleasure"; also: 'lasting', in contrast to 'transient' (dukkha)) "born of viveka" (traditionally, "seclusion"; alternatively, "discrimination" (of dhamma's) (Note: Arbel explains that "viveka" is usually translated as "detachment," "separation," or "seclusion," but the primary meaning is "discrimination." According to Arbel, the usage of vivicca/vivicceva and viveka in the description of the first dhyana "plays with both meanings of the verb; namely, its meaning as discernment and the consequent 'seclusion' and letting go," in line with the "discernment of the nature of experience" developed by the four satipatthanas. Compare Dogen: "Being apart from all disturbances and dwelling alone in a quiet place is called "enjoying serenity and tranquility."" Arbel further argues that viveka resembles dhamma vicaya, which is mentioned in the bojjhanga, an alternative description of the dhyanas, but the only bojjhanga-term not mentioned in the stock dhyana-description. Compare Sutta Nipatha 5.14 Udayamāṇavapucchā (The Questions of Udaya): "Pure equanimity and mindfulness, preceded by investigation of principles—this, I declare, is liberation by enlightenment, the smashing of ignorance.” (Translation: Sujato))), accompanied by vitarka-vicara (traditionally, initial and sustained attention to a meditative object; alternatively, initial inquiry and subsequent investigation of dhammas (defilements and wholesome thoughts (Note: Stta Nipatha 5:13 Udaya’s Questions (transl. Thanissaro): "With delight the world’s fettered. With directed thought it’s examined." Chen 2017: "Samadhi with general examination and specific in-depth investigation means getting rid of the not virtuous dharmas, such as greedy desire and hatred, to stay in joy and pleasure caused by nonarising, and to enter the first meditation and fully dwell in it." Arbel 2016, p. 73: "Thus, my suggestion is that we should interpret the existence of vitakka and vicara in the first jhana as wholesome 'residues' of a previous development of wholesome thoughts. They denote the 'echo' of these wholesome thoughts, which reverberates in one who enters the first jhana as wholesome attitudes toward what is experienced.")); also: "discursive thought" (Note: In the Pali canon, Vitakka-vicāra form one expression, which refers to directing one's thought or attention on an object (vitarka) and investigate it (vicāra). According to Dan Lusthaus, vitarka-vicāra is analytic scrutiny, a form of prajna. It "involves focusing on [something] and then breaking it down into its functional components" to understand it, "distinguishing the multitude of conditioning factors implicated in a phenomenal event." The Theravada commentarial tradition, as represented by Buddhaghosa's Visuddhimagga, interprets vitarka and vicāra as the initial and sustained application of attention to a meditational object, which culminates in the stilling of the mind when moving on to the second dhyana. According to Martin Stuart-Fox and Rod Bucknell it may also refer to "the normal process of discursive thought," which is quieted through absorption in the second jhāna.)).
2. Second jhāna:
  Again, with the stilling of vitarka-vicara, a bhikkhu enters upon and abides in the second jhana, which is [mental] pīti and [bodily] sukha "born of samadhi" (samadhi-ji; trad. born of "concentration"; altern. "knowing but non-discursive [...] awareness," "bringing the buried latencies or samskaras into full view" (Note: The standard translation for samadhi is "concentration"; yet, this translation/interpretation is based on commentarial interpretations, as explained by a number of contemporary authors. Tilmann Vetter notes that samadhi has a broad range of meanings, and "concentration" is just one of them. Vetter argues that the second, third and fourth dhyana are samma-samadhi, "right samadhi," building on a "spontaneous awareness" (sati) and equanimity which is perfected in the fourth dhyana.)), and has sampasadana ("stillness," "inner tranquility" (Note: The common translation, based on the commentarial interpretation of dhyana as expanding states of absorption, translates sampasadana as "internal assurance." Yet, as Bucknell explains, it also means "tranquilizing," which is more apt in this context. See also Passaddhi.)) and ekaggata (unification of mind, awareness) without vitarka-vicara;
3. Third jhāna:
  With the fading away of pīti, a bhikkhu abides in upekkhā (equanimity," "affective detachment" (Note: Upekkhā is one of the Brahmaviharas.)), sato (mindful) and [with] sampajañña ("fully knowing," "discerning awareness"). [Still] experiencing sukha with the body, he enters upon and abides in the third jhana, on account of which the noble ones announce, "abiding in [bodily] pleasure, one is equanimous and mindful".
4. Fourth jhāna:
  With the abandoning of [the desire for] sukha ("pleasure") and [aversion to] dukkha ("pain") and with the previous disappearance of [the inner movement between] somanassa ("gladness,") and domanassa ("discontent"), a bhikkhu enters upon and abides in the fourth jhana, which is adukkham asukham ("neither-painful-nor-pleasurable," "freedom from pleasure and pain") and has upekkhā-sati-parisuddhi (complete purity of equanimity and mindfulness). (Note: With the fourth jhāna comes the attainment of higher knowledge (abhijñā), that is, the extinction of all mental intoxicants (āsava), but also psychic powers. For instance in AN 5.28, the Buddha states (Thanissaro, 1997.): "When a monk has developed and pursued the five-factored noble right concentration in this way, then whichever of the six higher knowledges he turns his mind to know and realize, he can witness them for himself whenever there is an opening...." "If he wants, he wields manifold supranormal powers. Having been one he becomes many; having been many he becomes one. He appears. He vanishes. He goes unimpeded through walls, ramparts, and mountains as if through space. He dives in and out of the earth as if it were water. He walks on water without sinking as if it were dry land. Sitting crosslegged he flies through the air like a winged bird. With his hand he touches and strokes even the sun and moon, so mighty and powerful. He exercises influence with his body even as far as the Brahma worlds. He can witness this for himself whenever there is an opening ...")

=== The arūpa āyatanas ===
Grouped into the jhāna-scheme are four meditative states referred to in the early texts as arūpa-āyatanas. These are also referred to in commentarial literature as arūpa-jhānas ("formless" or "immaterial" jhānas), corresponding to the arūpa-loka (translated as the "formless realm" or the "formless dimensions"), to be distinguished from the first four jhānas (rūpa jhānas). In the Buddhist canonical texts, the word "jhāna" is never explicitly used to denote them; they are instead referred to as āyatana. However, they are sometimes mentioned in sequence after the first four jhānas (other texts, e.g. MN 121, treat them as a distinct set of attainments) and thus came to be treated by later exegetes as jhānas.

The four arūpa-āyatanas/arūpa-jhānas are:

- Fifth jhāna: infinite space (Pāḷi ākāsānañcāyatana, Skt. ākāśānantyāyatana)
- Sixth jhāna: infinite consciousness (Pāḷi viññāṇañcāyatana, Skt. vijñānānantyāyatana)
- Seventh jhāna: infinite nothingness (Pāḷi ākiñcaññāyatana, Skt. ākiṃcanyāyatana)
- Eighth jhāna: neither perception nor non-perception (Pāḷi nevasaññānāsaññāyatana, Skt. naivasaṃjñānāsaṃjñāyatana)

=== Nirodha-samāpatti ===
Beyond the dimension of neither perception nor non-perception lies a state called nirodha samāpatti, the "cessation of perception and feeling". Only in commentarial and scholarly literature, this is sometimes called the "ninth jhāna". Another name for this state is saññāvedayitanirodha ("cessation of perception and feeling"). According to Buddhaghosa's Visuddhimagga (XXIII, 18), it is characterized by the temporary suppression of consciousness and its concomitant mental factors, so the contemplative reaches a state unconscious (acittaka) for a week at most. In the nirodha the meditator is not dead: life-force (āyu) and bodily heat (usmā) remain. Neuroscientists have recently studied this phenomenon empirically and proposed a model for its neural-substrate.

=== Broader dhyana-practices ===
While dhyana typically refers to the four jhanas/dhyanas, the term also refers to a set of practices which seem to go back to a very early stage of the Buddhist tradition. These practices are the contemplation on the body-parts and their repulsiveness (patikulamanasikara); contemplation on the elements of which the body is composed; contemplation on the stages of decay of a dead body; and mindfulness of breathing (anapanasati). These practices are described in the Satipatthana Sutta of the Pali canon and the equivalent texts of the Chinese agamas, in which they are interwoven with the factors of the four dhyanas or the seven factors of awakening (bojjhanga). This set of practices was also transmitted via the Dhyana sutras, which are based on the Sarvastivada-tradition, forming the basis of the Chan/Zen-tradition.

== Early Buddhism ==
The Buddhist tradition has incorporated two traditions regarding the use of jhāna. There is a tradition that stresses attaining insight (vipassanā) as the means to awakening (bodhi, prajñā, kenshō) and liberation (vimutti, nibbāna). (Note: According to the Theravada tradition dhyāna must be combined with vipassanā, which gives insight into the three marks of existence and leads to detachment and "the manifestation of the path".) But the Buddhist tradition has also incorporated the yogic tradition, as reflected in the use of jhāna as a concentrative practice, which—in some interpretations—is rejected in other sūtras as not resulting in the final result of liberation. One solution to this contradiction is the conjunctive use of vipassanā and samatha. (Note: In Zen Buddhism, this problem has appeared over the centuries in the disputes over sudden versus gradual enlightenment.)

=== Origins of the jhāna/dhyāna-stages ===
==== Textual accounts ====
The Mahasaccaka Sutta, Majjhima Nikaya 36, narrates the story of the Buddha's awakening. According to this story, he learned two kinds of meditation from two teachers, Āḷāra Kālāma and the Jain teacher Uddaka Rāmaputta. These forms of meditation did not lead to liberation, and he then underwent harsh ascetic practices, with which he eventually also became disillusioned. The Buddha then recalled a meditative state he entered by chance as a child:

I thought: 'I recall once, when my father the Sakyan was working, and I was sitting in the cool shade of a rose-apple tree, then—quite secluded from sensuality, secluded from unskillful mental qualities—I entered & remained in the first jhana: rapture & pleasure born from seclusion, accompanied by directed thought & evaluation. Could that be the path to Awakening?' Then following on that memory came the realization: 'That is the path to Awakening.'

Originally, the practice of dhyāna itself may have constituted the core liberating practice of early Buddhism, since in this state all "pleasure and pain" had waned. According to Vetter,

Probably the word "immortality" (a-mata) was used by the Buddha for the first interpretation of this experience and not the term cessation of suffering that belongs to the Four Noble Truths [...] the Buddha did not achieve the experience of salvation by discerning the Four Noble Truths and/or other data. But his experience must have been of such a nature that it could bear the interpretation "achieving immortality".

==== Possible Buddhist transformation of yogic practices ====
The time of the Buddha saw the rise of the śramaṇa movement, ascetic practitioners with a body of shared teachings and practices. The strict delineation of this movement into Jainism, Buddhism and Brahmanical/Upanishadic traditions is a later development. (Note: Thomas William Rhys Davids and Maurice Walshe agreed that the term samādhi is not found in any pre-Buddhist text but is first mentioned in the Tipiṭaka. It was subsequently incorporated into later texts such as the Maitrayaniya Upanishad. But according to Matsumoto, "the terms dhyana and samahita (entering samadhi) appear already in Upanishadic texts that predate the origins of Buddhism". Note that of the 200 or so Upanishads, only the first 10 or 12 are considered the oldest and principal Upanishads. Among these 10 or 12 principal Upanishads, the Taittiriya, Aitareya and Kausitaki show Buddhist influence. The Brihadaranyaka, Jaiminiya-Upanishad-Brahmana, and Chandogya Upanishads were composed during the pre-Buddhist era, while the rest of these 12 oldest Upanishads are dated to the last few centuries BCE.) According to Crangle, the development of meditative practices in ancient India was a complex interplay between Vedic and non-Vedic traditions. According to Bronkhorst, the four rūpa-jhānas may be an original contribution of the Buddha to the religious practices of ancient India, forming an alternative to the ascetic practices of the Jains and similar śramaṇa traditions, while the arūpa-āyatanas were incorporated from non-Buddhist ascetic traditions.

“That meditation-expert (muni) becomes eternally free who, seeking the Supreme Goal, is able to withdraw from external phenomena by fixing his gaze within the mid-spot of the eyebrows and by neutralizing the even currents of prana and apana [that flow] within the nostrils and lungs; and to control his sensory mind and intellect; and to banish desire, fear, and anger.”

— Bhagavad Gita V:27-28

Kalupahana argues that the Buddha "reverted to the meditational practices" he had learned from Āḷāra Kālāma and Uddaka Rāmaputta, "directed at the appeasement of mind rather than the development of insight." Moving beyond these initial practices, reflection gave him the essential insight into conditioning, and taught him how to appease his "dispositional tendencies", without either being dominated by them, nor completely annihilating them.

Wynne claims that the attainment of the formless meditative absorption was incorporated from Brahmanical practices, and have Brahmnanical cosmogenies as their doctrinal background. (Note: Wynne explains that Brahmanic passages on meditation suggest that the most basic presupposition of early Brahmanical yoga is that the creation of the world must be reversed, through a series of meditative states, by the yogin who seeks the realization of the self. These states were given doctrinal background in early Brahminic cosmogenies, which classified the world into successively coarser strata. One such stratification is found at TU II.1 and Mbh XII.195, and proceeds as follows: self, space, wind, fire, water, earth. Mbh XII.224 gives alternatively: Brahman, mind, space, wind, fire, water, earth.) Wynne therefore concludes that these practices were borrowed from a Brahminic source, suggesting that Uddaka Rāmaputta, regardes as a Jain by others, and Āḷāra Kālāma were Brahmanical teachers. Yet the Buddha rejected their doctrines, as they were not liberating, and discovered his own path to awakening, which "consisted of the adaptation of the old yogic techniques to the practice of mindfulness and attainment of insight." Thus "radically transform[ed]" application of yogic practices was conceptualized in the scheme of the four jhānas.

According to Bronkhorst the Buddha's teachings developed primarily in response to Jain teachings, not Brahmanical teachings, and the account of the Buddha practicing under Uddaka Rāmaputta and Āḷāra Kālāma is entirely fictitious, and meant to flesh out the mentioning of those names in the post-enlightenment narrative in Majjhima Nikaya 36. Vishvapani notes that the Brahmanical texts cited by Wynne assumed their final form long after the Buddha's lifetime, with the Mokshadharma postdating him. Vishvapani further notes that Uddaka Rāmaputta and Āḷāra Kālāma may well have been sramanic teachers, as the Buddhist tradition asserts, not Brahmins.

=== Five possibilities regarding jhāna and liberation ===
A stock phrase in the canon states that one develops the four rupa-jhānas and then attains liberating insight. While the texts often refer to comprehending the Four Noble Truths as constituting this "liberating insight", Schmithausen notes that the Four Noble Truths as constituting "liberating insight" (here referring to paññā) is a later addition to texts such as Majjhima Nikaya 36.

Schmithausen discerns three possible roads to liberation as described in the suttas, to which Vetter adds a fourth possibility, while the attainment of nirodha-samāpatti may constitute a fifth possibility:

1. Mastering the four jhānas, whereafter "liberating insight" is attained;
2. Mastering the four jhānas and the four arūpa-āyatanas, whereafter "liberating insight" is attained;
3. Liberating insight itself suffices;
4. The four jhānas themselves constituted the core liberating practice of early Buddhism, c.q. the Buddha;
5. Liberation is attained in nirodha-samāpatti.

==== Rūpa-jhānas followed by liberating insight ====
According to the Theravada tradition, the meditator uses the jhāna state to bring the mind to rest, and to strengthen and sharpen the mind, in order to investigate the true nature of phenomena (dhamma) and to gain insight into impermanence, suffering and not-self. According to the Theravada-tradition, the arahant is aware that the jhānas are ultimately unsatisfactory, realizing that the meditative attainments are also anicca, impermanent.

In the Mahasaccaka Sutta (Majjhima Nikaya 36), which narrates the story of the Buddha's awakening, dhyāna is followed by insight into the Four Noble Truths. The mention of the Four Noble Truths as constituting "liberating insight" is probably a later addition. Vetter notes that such insight is not possible in a state of dhyāna, when interpreted as concentration, since discursive thinking is eliminated in such a state. He also notes that the emphasis on "liberating insight" developed only after the four noble truths were introduced as an expression of what this "liberating insight" constituted. In time, other expressions took over this function, such as pratītyasamutpāda and the emptiness of the self.

==== Rūpa-jhānas and arūpa-āyatanas, followed by liberating insight ====
This scheme is rejected by some scholars as a later development, since the āyatanas are akin to non-Buddhist practices, and rejected elsewhere in the canon.

==== Insight alone suffices ====
The emphasis on "liberating insight" alone seems to be a later development, in response to developments in Indian religious thought, which saw "liberating insight" as essential to liberation. This may also have been due to an over-literal interpretation by later scholastics of the terminology used by the Buddha, and to the problems involved with the practice of dhyāna, and the need to develop an easier method.

Contemporary scholars have discerned a broader application of jhāna in historical Buddhist practice. Alexander Wynne summarizes this view in stating that the ultimate aim of dhyāna was the attainment of insight, and the application of the meditative state to the practice of mindfulness. According to Frauwallner, mindfulness was a means to prevent the arising of craving, which resulted simply from contact between the senses and their objects, and this may have been the Buddha's original idea. According to Wynne, though, this stress on mindfulness may have led to the intellectualism which favored insight over the practice of dhyāna.

==== Jhāna itself is liberating ====
Both Schmithausen and Bronkhorst note that the attainment of insight, which is a cognitive activity, cannot be possible in a state wherein all cognitive activity has ceased. According to Vetter, therefore, the practice of (rupa-)jhāna itself may have constituted the core practice of early Buddhism, with practices such as sila and mindfulness aiding its development. It is the "middle way" between self-mortification, ascribed by Bronkhorst to Jainism, and indulgence in sensual pleasure. Vetter emphasizes that dhyana is a form of non-sensual happiness. The eightfold path can be seen as a path of preparation which leads to the practice of samadhi.

==== Liberation in nirodha-samāpatti ====
According to some texts, after progressing through the eight jhānas and the stage of nirodha-samāpatti, a person is liberated. According to some traditions someone attaining the state of nirodha-samāpatti is an anagami or an arahant. In the Anupadda sutra, the Buddha narrates that Sariputta became an arahant upon reaching it.

== Theravada ==
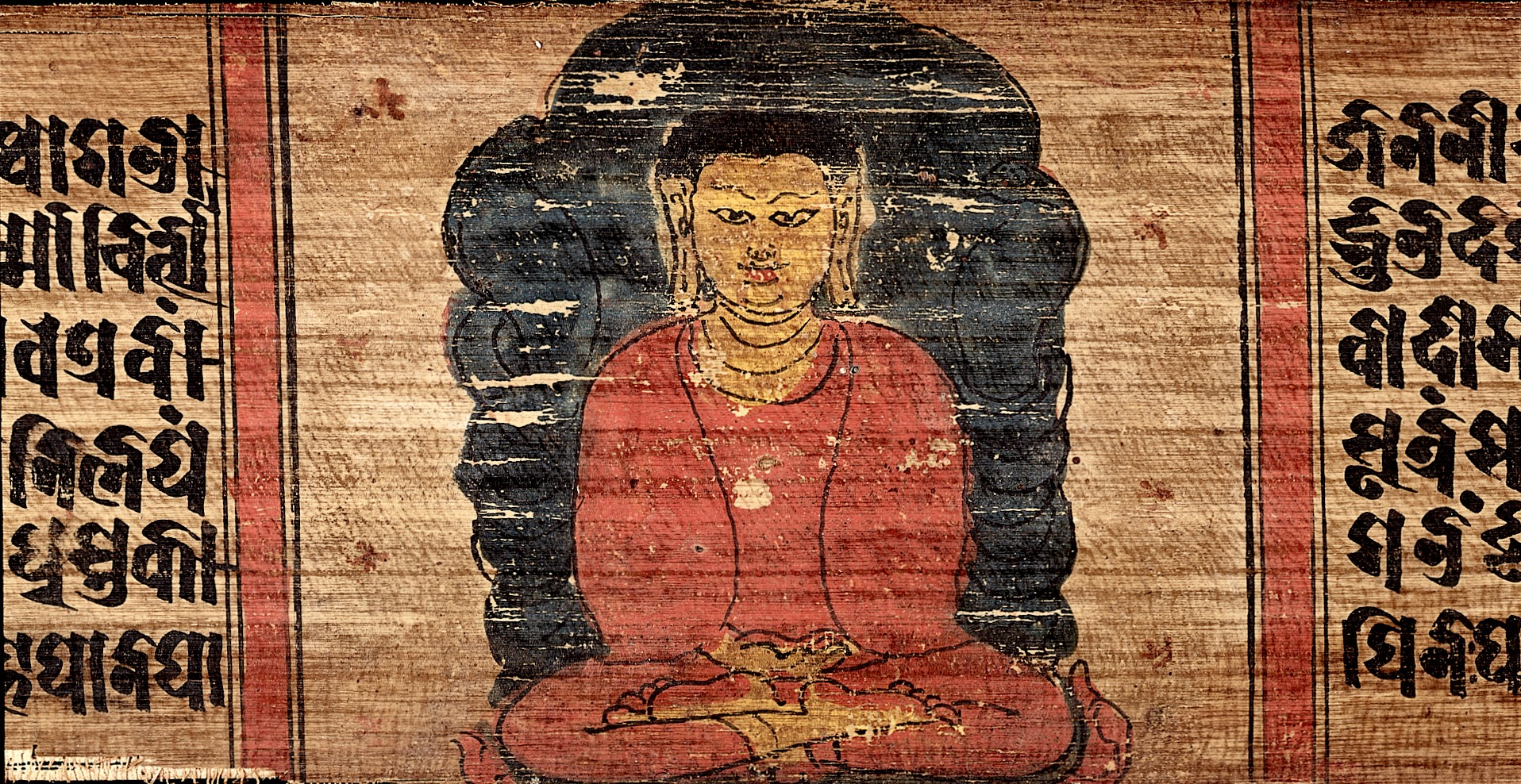
Buddha in Dhyana, which in this context means: The meditative training stage on the path to Samadhi

=== The five hindrances ===
In the commentarial tradition, the development of jhāna is described as the development of five mental factors (Sanskrit: caitasika; Pali: cetasika) that counteract the five hindrances: (Note: See, for instance, Samādhaṅga Sutta (a/k/a, Pañcaṅgikasamādhi Sutta, AN 5.28) (Thanissaro, 1997b).)

Table: Factors of rūpa jhāna
Cetasika (mental factors)	First jhāna	Second jhāna	Third jhāna	Fourth jhāna
Kāma / Akusala dhamma (sensuality / unskillful qualities)	secluded from; withdrawn	does not occur	does not occur	does not occur
Pīti (rapture)	seclusion-born; pervades body	samādhi-born; pervades body	fades away (along with distress)	does not occur
Sukha (non-sensual pleasure)	seclusion-born; pervades body	samādhi-born; pervades body	pervades physical body	abandoned (no pleasure nor pain)
Vitakka ("applied thought")	accompanies jhāna	unification of awareness free from vitakka and vicāra	does not occur	does not occur
Vicāra ("sustained thought")	accompanies jhāna	unification of awareness free from vitakka and vicāra	does not occur	does not occur
Upekkhāsatipārisuddhi (pure, mindful equanimity)	does not occur	internal confidence	equanimous; mindful	purity of equanimity and mindfulness
Sources:

1. vitakka ("applied thought") counteracts sloth and torpor (lethargy and drowsiness)
2. vicāra ("sustained thought") counteracts doubt (uncertainty)
3. pīti (rapture) counteracts ill-will (malice)
4. sukha (non-sensual pleasure) counteracts restlessness-worry (excitation and anxiety)
5. ekaggata (one-pointedness) counteracts sensory desire

=== Jhāna as concentration ===
Buddhagosa's Visuddhimagga considers jhāna to be an exercise in concentration-meditation. His views, together with the Satipatthana Sutta, inspired the development, in the 19th and 20th century, of new meditation techniques which gained a great popularity among lay audiences in the second half of the 20th century.

==== Samadhi ====
According to Henepola Gunaratana, the term "jhāna" is closely connected with "samadhi", which is generally rendered as "concentration". The word "samadhi" is almost interchangeable with the word "samatha", serenity. According to Gunaratana, in the widest sense the word samadhi is used for the practices which lead to the development of serenity. In this sense, samadhi and jhāna are close in meaning. (Note: Gunarathana refers to Buddhaghosa, who explains samadhi etymologically as "the centering of consciousness and consciousness concomitants evenly and rightly on a single object [...] the state in virtue of which consciousness and its concomitants remain evenly and rightly on a single object, undistracted and unscattered (Vism.84–85; PP.85).") Nevertheless, they are not exactly identical, since "certain differences in their suggested and contextual meanings prevent unqualified identification of the two terms." Samadhi signifies only one mental factor, namely one-pointedness, while the word "jhāna" encompasses the whole state of consciousness, "or at least the whole group of mental factors individuating that meditative state as a jhana." Furthermore, according to Gunaratana, samadhi involves "a wider range of reference than jhana", noting that "the Pali exegetical tradition recognizes three levels of samadhi: preliminary concentration (parikammasamadhi) [...] access concentration (upacarasamadhi) [...] and absorption concentration (appanasamadhi)."

==== Development and application of concentration ====
According to the Pāli canon commentarial tradition, access/neighbourhood concentration (upacāra-samādhi) is a stage of meditation that the meditator reaches before entering into jhāna. The overcoming of the five hindrances (Note: Sensual desire, ill will, sloth and torpor, restlessness and worry and doubt) mark the entry into access concentration. Access concentration is not mentioned in the discourses of the Buddha, but there are several suttas where a person gains insight into the Dhamma on hearing a teaching from the Buddha. (Note: According to Peter Harvey, access concentration is described at Digha Nikaya I, 110, among other places: "The situation at D I, 110, then, can be seen as one where the hearer of a discourse enters a state which, while not an actual jhana, could be bordering on it. As it is free from hindrances, it could be seen as 'access' concentration with a degree of wisdom." Peter Harvey, Consciousness Mysticism in the Discourses of the Buddha. In Karel Werner, ed., The Yogi and the Mystic. Curzon Press 1989, page 95. See also: Peter Harvey, The Selfless Mind, page 170.) (Note: The equivalent of upacāra-samādhi used in Tibetan commentaries is nyer-bsdogs.)

According to Tse-fu Kuan, at the state of access concentration, some meditators may experience vivid mental imagery, (Note: Pāli: nimitta) which is similar to a vivid dream. They are as vivid as if seen by the eye, but in this case the meditator is fully aware and conscious that they are seeing mental images. Tse-fu Kuan grounds this view in the early texts, with further explication to be found in the Theravāda commentaries.

According to Venerable Sujivo, as the concentration becomes stronger, the feelings of breathing and of having a physical body will completely disappear, leaving only pure awareness. At this stage inexperienced meditators may become afraid, thinking that they are going to die if they continue the concentration, because the feeling of breathing and the feeling of having a physical body has completely disappeared. Sujivo explains that this fear is needless and that the practitioner should instead continue concentration, in order to reach "full concentration" (jhāna).

A meditator should first master the lower jhānas, before they can go into the higher jhānas. According to Nathan Katz, the early suttas state that "the most exquisite of recluses" is able to attain any of the jhānas and abide in them without difficulty. (Note: According to Sujiva, there are five aspects of jhāna mastery: 1. Mastery in adverting: the ability to advert to the jhāna factors one by one after emerging from the jhāna, wherever desired, whenever she/ he wants, and for as long as one wants.; 2. Mastery in attaining: the ability to enter upon jhāna quickly.; 3. Mastery in resolving: the ability to remain in the jhāna for exactly the pre-determined length of time.; 4. Mastery in emerging: the ability to emerge from jhāna quickly without difficulty.; 5. Mastery in reviewing: the ability to review the jhāna and its factors with retrospective knowledge immediately after adverting to them.)

In the doctrine of the contemporary Vipassana movement, the jhāna state cannot by itself lead to enlightenment as it only suppresses the defilements. Meditators must use the jhāna state as an instrument for developing wisdom by cultivating insight, and use it to penetrate the true nature of phenomena through direct cognition, which will lead to cutting off the defilements and nibbana.

According to the later Theravāda commentorial tradition as outlined by Buddhagoṣa in his Visuddhimagga, after coming out of the state of jhāna the meditator will be in the state of post-jhāna access concentration. In this state the investigation and analysis of the true nature of phenomena begins, which leads to insight into the characteristics of impermanence, suffering and not-self arises.

=== Criticism ===
While the jhānas are often understood as deepening states of concentration, due to its description as such in the Abhidhamma, and the Visuddhimagga, since the 1980s some academics and contemporary Theravādins have begun to question both this understanding of the jhānas as being states of deep absorption, and the idea that they are not necessary for the attainment of liberation. While significant research on this topic has been done by Bareau, Schmithausen, Martin Stuart-Fox, Rod Bucknell, Vetter, Bronkhorst, and Wynne, Theravāda practitioners have also scrutinized and criticised the samatha-vipassana distinction. Reassessments of the description of jhāna in the suttas consider jhāna and vipassana to be an integrated practice, leading to a "tranquil and equanimous awareness of whatever arises in the field of experience."

==== Scholarly criticism ====
While the commentarial tradition regards vitarka and vicara as initial and sustained concentration on a meditation object, (Note: See here.) Roderick S. Bucknell notes that vitarka and vicara may refer to "probably nothing other than the normal process of discursive thought, the familiar but usually unnoticed stream of mental imagery and verbalization." Bucknell further notes that "[t]hese conclusions conflict with the widespread conception of the first jhāna as a state of deep concentration."

According to Stuart-Fox, the Abhidhamma separated vitarka from vicara, and ekaggata (one-pointedness) was added to the description of the first dhyāna to give an equal number of five hindrances and five antidotes. The commentarial tradition regards the qualities of the first dhyāna to be antidotes to the five hindrances, and ekaggata may have been added to the first dhyāna to give exactly five antidotes for the five hindrances. Stuart-Fox further notes that vitarka, being discursive thought, will do very little as an antidote for sloth and torpor, reflecting the inconsistencies which were introduced by the scholastics.

Upekkhā, equanimity, which is perfected in the fourth dhyāna, is one of the four Brahmā-vihāra. While the commentarial tradition downplayed the importance of the Brahmā-vihāra, Gombrich holds that the Buddhist usage of the term Brahmā-vihāra originally referred to an awakened state of mind, and a concrete attitude toward other beings which was equal to "living with Brahman" here and now. The later tradition, in this interpretation, took those descriptions too literally, linking them to cosmology and understanding them as "living with Brahman" by rebirth in the Brahmā-world. According to Gombrich, "the Buddha taught that kindness—what Christians tend to call love—was a way to salvation.

Vetter, Gombrich and Wynne note that the first and second jhāna represent the onset of dhyāna due to withdrawal and right effort c.q. the four right efforts, followed by concentration, whereas the third and fourth jhāna combine concentration with mindfulness. Polak, elaborating on Vetter, notes that the onset of the first dhyāna is described as a quite natural process, due to the preceding efforts to restrain the senses and the nurturing of wholesome states. Regarding samādhi as the eighth step of the Noble Eightfold Path, Vetter notes that samādhi consists of the four stages of dhyāna meditation, but

...to put it more accurately, the first dhyana seems to provide, after some time, a state of strong concentration, from which the other stages come forth; the second stage is called samadhija" [...] "born from samadhi."

According to Richard Gombrich, the sequence of the four rūpa jhānas describes two different cognitive states: "I know this is controversial, but it seems to me that the third and fourth jhānas are thus quite unlike the second." (Note: Original publication: Gombrich, Richard (2007), Religious Experience in Early Buddhism, OCHS Library) Gombrich and Wynne note that, while the second jhāna denotes a state of absorption, in their interpretation of the third and fourth jhāna, one comes out of this absorption, being mindfully aware of objects while being indifferent to them. (Note: Original publication: Gombrich, Richard (2007), Religious Experience in Early Buddhism, OCHS Library) According to Gombrich, "the later tradition has falsified the jhana by classifying them as the quintessence of the concentrated, calming kind of meditation, ignoring the other—and indeed higher—element. According to Lusthaus, "mindfulness in [the fourth dhyāna] is an alert, relaxed awareness detached from positive and negative conditioning."

Gethin, followed by Polak and Arbel, further notes that there is a "definite affinity" between the four jhānas and the bojjhaṅgā, the seven factors of awakening. According to Gethin, the early Buddhist texts have "a broadly consistent vision" regarding meditation practice. Various practices lead to the development of the factors of awakening, which are not only the means to, but also the constituents of, awakening. According to Gethin, satipaṭṭhāna and ānāpānasati are related to a formula that summarizes the Buddhist path to awakening as "abandoning the hindrances, establishing [...] mindfulness, and developing the seven factors of awakening." This results in a "heightened awareness", "overcoming distracting and disturbing emotions", which are not particular elements of the path to awakening, but rather common disturbing and distracting emotions. Gethin further states that "the exegetical literature is essentially true to the vision of meditation presented in the Nikayas," applying the "perfect mindfulness, stillness and lucidity" of the jhānas to the contemplation of "reality", of the way things really are, as temporary and ever-changing. It is in this sense that "the jhana state has the transcendent, transforming quality of awakening."

Alexander Wynne states that the dhyāna-scheme is poorly understood. According to Wynne, words expressing the inculcation of awareness, such as sati, sampajāno, and upekkhā, are mistranslated or misunderstood as particular factors of meditative states, whereas they refer to a particular way of perceiving the sense objects:

Thus the expression sato sampajāno in the third jhāna must denote a state of awareness different from the meditative absorption of the second jhāna (cetaso ekodibhāva). It suggests that the subject is doing something different from remaining in a meditative state, i.e. that he has come out of his absorption and is now once again aware of objects. The same is true of the word upek(k)hā: it does not denote an abstract 'equanimity', [but] it means to be aware of something and indifferent to it [...] The third and fourth jhāna-s, as it seems to me, describe the process of directing states of meditative absorption towards the mindful awareness of objects.

However, this criticism of the traditional Theravādin interpretation has itself been criticized in return, with other scholars and practitioners holding that the higher jhānas either cannot involve discursive awareness, or—at least—that the "Abhidhamma-style" jhāna practice remains a tenable interpretation of the material found in the Pāli suttas, and will—equivalently to the "lighter" jhāna practice recently championed by e.g. Wynne—yet lead to liberating insight.

==== Contemporary Theravāda reassessment: the "Jhana wars" ====
While Theravāda meditation was introduced to the west as vipassana-meditation, which rejected the usefulness of jhāna, there is a growing interest among western vipassana-practitioners in jhāna. The nature and practice of jhana is a topic of debate and contention among western convert Theravadins, to the extent that the disputes have even been called "the Jhana wars." (Note: See also: * Leigh Brasington, Interpretations of the Jhanas * Simple|Sutta, Jhana Wars! * Dhamma Wheel, The great Jhana debate)

===== Criticism of Visudhimagga =====
The Visuddhimagga, and the "pioneering popularizing work of Daniel Goleman", (Note: See Golman's The Varieties of Meditative Experience, published early 1970s, which praises the Visuddhimagga as a master guide for the practice of meditation.) has been influential in the (mis)understanding of dhyana being a form of concentration-meditation. The Visuddhimagga is centered around kasina-meditation, a form of concentration-meditation in which the mind is focused on a (mental) object. According to Thanissaro Bhikkhu, "[t]he text then tries to fit all other meditation methods into the mold of kasina practice, so that they too give rise to countersigns, but even by its own admission, breath meditation does not fit well into the mold." Thanissaro further states that "the Visuddhimagga uses a very different paradigm for concentration from what you find in the Canon." In its emphasis on kasina meditation, the Visuddhimagga departs from the Pali Canon, in which dhyāna is the central meditative practice, indicating that what "jhāna means in the commentaries is something quite different from what it means in the Canon."

Bhante Henepola Gunaratana contends that "what the suttas say is not the same as what the Visuddhimagga says [...] they are actually different," leading to a divergence between the traditional scholarly understanding and the recent re-examination of descriptions in the suttas. Gunaratana further notes that Buddhaghosa invented several key meditation terms which are not to be found in the suttas, such as "parikamma samadhi (preparatory concentration), upacara samadhi (access concentration), appanasamadhi (absorption concentration)." Gunaratana also notes that Buddhaghosa's emphasis on kasina-meditation is not to be found in the suttas, where dhyāna is always combined with mindfulness. (Note: See also Bronkhorst (1993), Two Traditions of Meditation in ancient India; Wynne (2007), The Origin of Buddhist Meditation; and Polak (2011), Reexaming Jhana.)

According to scholar Tilman Vetter, dhyāna as a preparation of discriminating insight must have been different from the dhyāna-practice introduced by the Buddha, using e.g. kasina exercises to produce a "more artificially produced dhyana", resulting in the cessation of apperceptions and feelings. Shankman notes that kasina exercises are propagated in Buddhaghosa's Visuddhimagga, which is considered the authoritative commentary on meditation practice in the Theravāda tradition, but differs from the Pāli canon in its description of jhāna. While the suttas connect samadhi to mindfulness and awareness of the body, for Buddhaghosa jhāna is a purely mental exercise, in which one-pointed concentration leads to a narrowing of attention.

===== Jhana as integrated practice =====
Several western teachers (Thanissaro Bhikkhu, Leigh Brasington, Richard Shankman) make a distinction between "sutta-oriented" jhana and "Visuddhimagga-oriented" jhana, dubbed "minimalists" and "maximalists" by Kenneth Rose.

Ṭhānissaro Bhikkhu, a western teacher in the Thai Forest Tradition, has repeatedly argued that the Pāli Canon and the Visuddhimagga give different descriptions of the jhānas, regarding the Visuddhimagga description to be incorrect. Accordingly, he advises against the development of strong states of concentration. Arbel describes the fourth jhāna as "non-reactive and lucid awareness", not as a state of deep concentration.

According to Richard Shankman, the sutta descriptions of jhāna practice explain that the meditator does not emerge from jhāna to practice vipassana but rather the work of insight is done whilst in jhāna itself. In particular the meditator is instructed to "enter and remain in the fourth jhāna" before commencing the work of insight in order to uproot the mental defilements. (Note: Samaññaphala Sutta: "With the abandoning of pleasure and pain — as with the earlier disappearance of elation and distress — he enters and remains in the fourth jhāna: purity of equanimity and mindfulness, neither-pleasure nor pain...With his mind thus concentrated, purified, and bright, unblemished, free from defects, pliant, malleable, steady, and attained to imperturbability, the monk directs and inclines it to the knowledge of the ending of the mental fermentations. He discerns, as it has come to be, that 'This is suffering... This is the origination of suffering... This is the cessation of suffering... This is the way leading to the cessation of suffering... These are mental fermentations... This is the origination of fermentations... This is the cessation of fermentations... This is the way leading to the cessation of fermentations.")

Keren Arbel has conducted extensive research on the jhanas and the contemporary criticisms of the commentarial interpretation. Based on this research, and her own experience as a senior meditation-teacher, she gives a reconstructed account of the original meaning of the dhyānas. She argues that jhāna is an integrated practice, describing the fourth jhāna as "non-reactive and lucid awareness", not as a state of deep concentration. According to Arbel, it develops "a mind which is not conditioned by habitual reaction-patterns of likes and dislikes [...] a profoundly wise relation to experience, not tainted by any kind of wrong perception and mental reactivity rooted in craving (tanha)."

According to Kenneth Rose, the Visuddhimagga-oriented "maximalist" approach is a return to ancient Indian "mainstream practices", in which physical and mental immobility was thought to lead to equanimity and liberation from samsara and rebirth. This approach was rejected by the Buddha, turning to a gentler approach which still results in upekkha and sati, equanimous awareness of experience.

== In Mahāyāna traditions ==
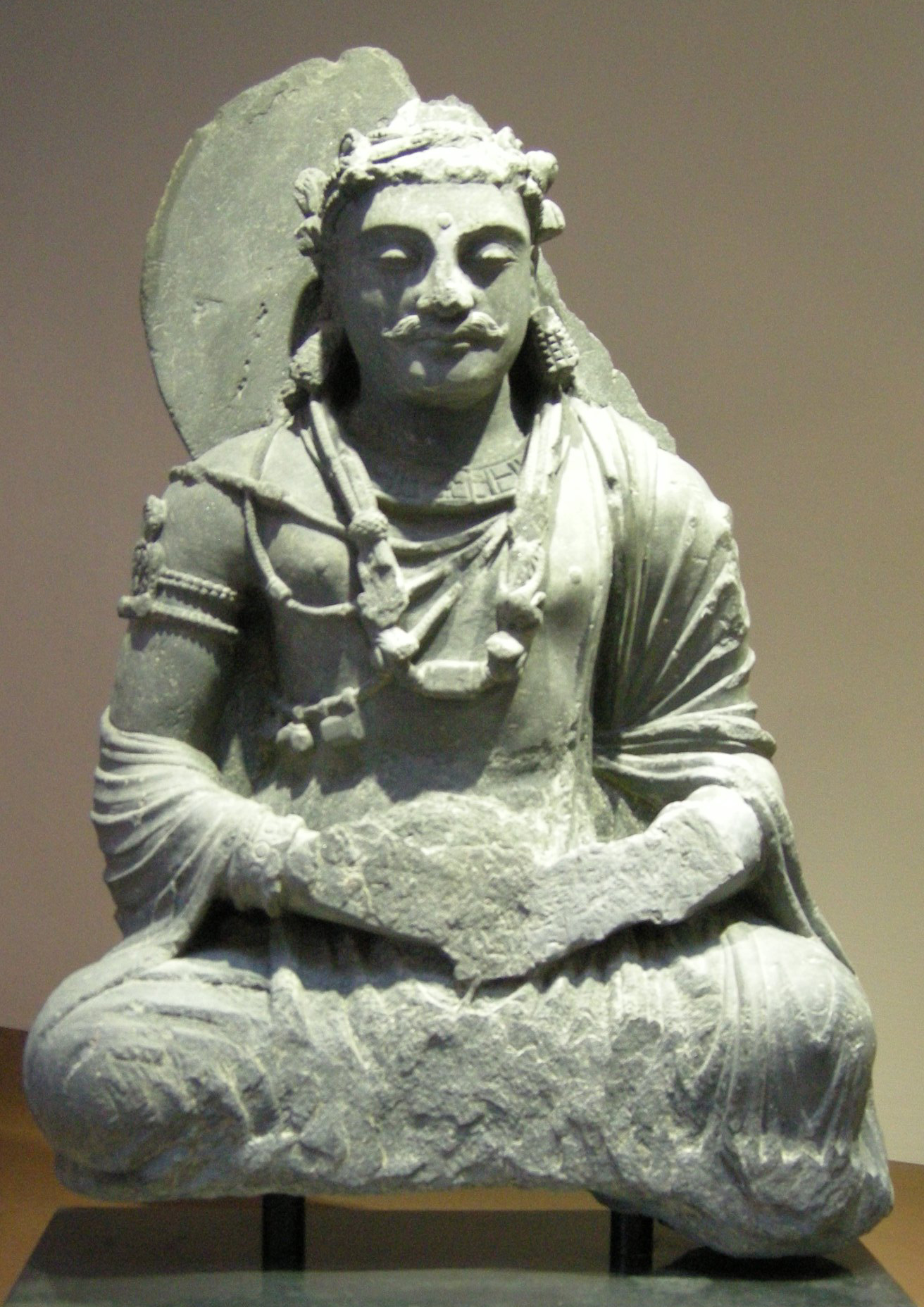
Bodhisattva seated in meditation. Afghanistan, 2nd century CE.

Mahāyāna Buddhism includes numerous schools of practice. Each draw upon various Buddhist sūtras, philosophical treatises, and commentaries, and each has its own emphasis, mode of expression, and philosophical outlook. Accordingly, each school has its own meditation methods for the purpose of developing samādhi and prajñā, with the goal of ultimately attaining enlightenment.

=== Dhyana as open awareness ===
Both Polak and Arbel suggest that the traditions of Dzogchen, Mahamudra and Chan preserve or resemble dhyana as an open awareness of body and mind, thus transcending the dichotomy between vipassana and samatha. (Note: Arbel refers to Bodhi (2011) What Does Minfulness really Mean? A Canonical perspective. Contemporary Buddhism 12, no.1, p.25: "... a stance of observation or wtachfulness towards one's own experience. One might even call this a stance of sati a 'bending back' of the light of consciousness upon the experiencing subject in its physical, sensory and psychological dimensions." "'Bending back' of the light" resembles Chinul's "turning back the radiance," in which the light of consciousness is turned back to apprehend the source of awareness; and Dogen in Fukan Zazen-gi, "Recommending Zazen to All People: "Take the backward step and turn the light inward. Your body-mind of itself will drop off and your original face will appear." This goes back to the Xinxin Ming, "Faith in Mind," attributed to the third Zen-patriarch Sengcan, which states "Turning the light around for an instant / routs becoming, abiding, and decay," and is expressed in the Chinese Chan practice of Observing the mind.)

=== Chan Buddhism ===
Anapanasati and dhyāna are a central aspect of Buddhist practice in Chan, necessary for progress on the path and "true entry into the Dharma". (Note: Dhyāna is a central aspect of Buddhist practice in Chan: * Nan Huai-Chin: "Intellectual reasoning is just another spinning of the sixth consciousness, whereas the practice of meditation is the true entry into the Dharma." * According to Sheng Yen, meditative concentration is necessary, calling samādhi one of the requisite factors for progress on the path toward enlightenment.)

==== Origins ====
In China, the word dhyāna was originally transliterated with Chinese: 禪那; pinyin: chánnà and shortened to just pinyin: chán in common usage. The word and the practice of Buddhist meditation entered into Chinese through the translations of An Shigao (fl. c. 148–180 CE), and Kumārajīva (334–413 CE), who translated Dhyāna sutras, which were influential early meditation texts mostly based on the Yogacara meditation teachings of the Sarvāstivāda school of Kashmir circa 1st–4th centuries CE. The word Chan became the designation for Chan Buddhism (Korean Seon, Vietnamese Thiền, Japanese Zen).

In Chinese Buddhism, following the Ur-text of the Satipatthana Sutra and the dhyana sutras, dhyāna refers to various kinds of meditation techniques and their preparatory practices, which are necessary to practice dhyana. The five main types of meditation in the Dhyana sutras are anapanasati (mindfulness of breathing); paṭikūlamanasikāra meditation, mindfulness of the impurities of the body; loving-kindness maitrī meditation; the contemplation on the twelve links of pratītyasamutpāda; and the contemplation on the Buddha's thirty-two Characteristics.

Downplaying the body-recollections (but maintaining the awareness of imminent death), the early Chan-tradition developed the notions or practices of wu nian ("no thought, no "fixation on thought, such as one's own views, experiences, and knowledge") and fēi sīliàng (非思量, Japanese: hishiryō, "nonthinking"); and kanxin ("observing the mind") and shou-i pu i (守一不移, "maintaining the one without wavering") turning the attention from the objects of experience, to the nature of mind, the perceiving subject itself, which is equated with Buddha-nature.

==== Mindfulness ====
===== Observing the breath =====
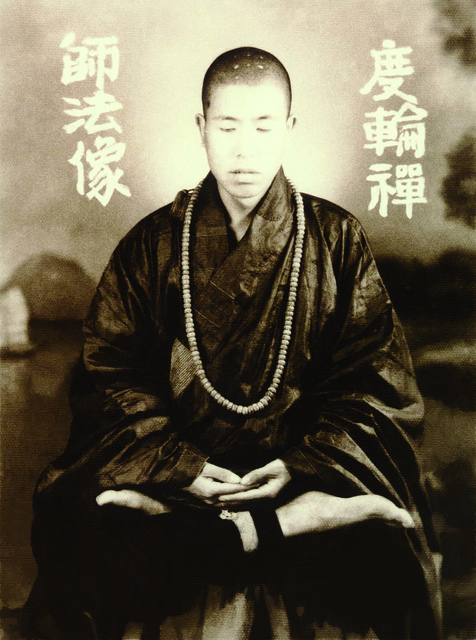
Venerable Hsuan Hua meditating in the Lotus Position. Hong Kong, 1953

During sitting meditation, practitioners usually assume a position such as the lotus position, half-lotus, Burmese, or yoga postures, using the dhyāna mudrā. To regulate the mind, awareness is directed towards counting or watching the breath or by bringing that awareness to the energy center below the navel (see also ānāpānasati). Often, a square or round cushion placed on a padded mat is used to sit on; in some other cases, a chair may be used. This practice may simply be called sitting dhyāna, which is zuòChan (坐禅) in Chinese, zazen (坐禅) in Japanese, jwaseon (坐禅) in Korean, and tọa thiền in Vietnamese.

===== Observing the mind =====
In the Sōtō school of Zen, meditation with no objects, anchors, or content, is the primary form of practice. The meditator strives to be aware of the stream of thoughts, allowing them to arise and pass away without interference. Considerable textual, philosophical, and phenomenological justification of this practice can be found throughout Dōgen's Shōbōgenzō, as for example in the "Principles of Zazen" and the "Universally Recommended Instructions for Zazen". In the Japanese language, this practice is called Shikantaza.

==== Insight ====
===== Pointing to the nature of the mind =====
According to Charles Luk, in the earliest traditions of Chan, there was no fixed method or formula for teaching meditation, and all instructions were simply heuristic methods, to point to the true nature of the mind, also known as Buddha-nature. According to Luk, this method is referred to as the "Mind Dharma", and exemplified in the story of Śākyamuni Buddha holding up a flower silently, and Mahākāśyapa smiling as he understood. (Note: See Flower Sermon) A traditional formula of this is, "Chan points directly to the human mind, to enable people to see their true nature and become buddhas."

===== Kōan practice =====
Chinese character for "nothing" (Hanyu Pinyin: wú; Japanese pronunciation: mu; Korean pronunciation: mu; Vietnamese: vô). It figures in the famous Zhaozhou's dog kōan.

At the beginning of the Sòng dynasty, practice with the kōan method became popular, whereas others practiced "silent illumination". This became the source of some differences in practice between the Línjì and Cáodòng schools.

A kōan, literally "public case", is a story or dialogue, describing an interaction between a Zen master and a student. These anecdotes give a demonstration of the master's insight. Koans emphasize the non-conceptional insight that the Buddhist teachings are pointing to. Koans can be used to provoke the "great doubt", and test a student's progress in Zen practice.

Kōan-inquiry may be practiced during zazen (sitting meditation), kinhin (walking meditation), and throughout all the activities of daily life. Kōan practice is particularly emphasized by the Japanese Rinzai school, but it also occurs in other schools or branches of Zen depending on the teaching line.

The Zen student's mastery of a given kōan is presented to the teacher in a private interview (referred to in Japanese as dokusan (独参), daisan (代参), or sanzen (参禅)). While there is no unique answer to a kōan, practitioners are expected to demonstrate their understanding of the kōan and of Zen through their responses. The teacher may approve or disapprove of the answer and guide the student in the right direction. The interaction with a Zen teacher is central in Zen, but makes Zen practice also vulnerable to misunderstanding and exploitation.

=== Vajrayāna ===
B. Alan Wallace holds that modern Tibetan Buddhism lacks emphasis on achieving levels of concentration higher than access concentration. According to Wallace, one possible explanation for this situation is that virtually all Tibetan Buddhist meditators seek to become enlightened through the use of tantric practices. These require the presence of sense desire and passion in one's consciousness, but jhāna effectively inhibits these phenomena.

While few Tibetan Buddhists, either inside or outside Tibet, devote themselves to the practice of concentration, Tibetan Buddhist literature does provide extensive instructions on it, and great Tibetan meditators of earlier times stressed its importance.

== Related concepts in Indian religions ==
Dhyana is an important ancient practice mentioned in the literature of Hinduism, as well as early texts of Jainism. Dhyana in Buddhism influenced these practices as well as was influenced by them, likely in its origins and its later development.

=== Parallels with Patanjali's Ashtanga Yoga ===
There are parallels with the fourth to eighth stages of Patanjali's Ashtanga Yoga, as mentioned in his classical work, Yoga Sutras of Patanjali, which were compiled around 400 CE by, taking materials about yoga from older traditions.

Patanjali discerns bahiranga (external) aspects of yoga namely, yama, niyama, asana, pranayama, and the antaranga (internal) yoga. Having actualized the pratyahara stage, a practitioner is able to effectively engage into the practice of Samyama. At the stage of pratyahara, the consciousness of the individual is internalized in order that the sensations from the senses of taste, touch, sight, hearing and smell do not reach their respective centers in the brain and takes the sadhaka (practitioner) to next stages of Yoga, namely Dharana (concentration), Dhyana (meditation), and Samadhi (mystical absorption), being the aim of all Yogic practices.

The Eight Limbs of the yoga sutras show Samadhi as one of its limbs. The Eight limbs of the Yoga Sutra was influenced by Buddhism. Vyasa's Yogabhashya, the commentary to the Yogasutras, and Vacaspati Misra's subcommentary state directly that the samadhi techniques are directly borrowed from the Buddhists' Jhana, with the addition of the mystical and divine interpretations of mental absorption. The Yoga Sutra, especially the fourth segment of Kaivalya Pada, contains several polemical verses critical of Buddhism, particularly the Vijñānavāda school of Vasubandhu.

The suttas show that during the time of the Buddha, Nigantha Nataputta, the Jain leader, did not even believe that it is possible to enter a state where the thoughts and examination stop.

== See also ==
- Research on meditation
- Altered state of consciousness
- Jñāna

== Sources ==
- Arbel, Keren (2016), Early Buddhist Meditation: The Four Jhanas as the Actualization of Insight, Routledge, doi:10.4324/9781315676043, ISBN 9781317383994
- Arbel, Keren (2017). Early Buddhist meditation : the four jhânas as the actualization of insight. London: Routledge. ISBN 978-1-317-38399-4.
- Baker, Kenneth (2008), The Lightning Field, Hol Art Books
- Berzin, Alexander (2006), Primary Minds and the 51 Mental Factors
- Blyth, R. H. (1966), Zen and Zen Classics, Volume 4, Tokyo: Hokuseido Press
- Brahm, Ajahn (2006), Mindfulness, Bliss, and Beyond: A Meditator's Handbook, Wisdom Publications
- Brahm, Ajahn (2007), Simply This Moment
- Bronkhorst, Johannes (1993), The Two Traditions Of Meditation In Ancient India, Motilal Banarsidass Publ.
- Bucknell, Robert S. (1993), "Reinterpreting the Jhanas", Journal of the International Association of Buddhist Studies, 16 (2)
- Chen, Naichen (2017), The Great Prajna Paramita Sutra, Volume 1, Wheatmark
- Cousins, L. S. (1996), "The origins of insight meditation" (PDF), in Skorupski, T. (ed.), The Buddhist Forum IV, seminar papers 1994–1996 (pp. 35–58), London, UK: School of Oriental and African Studies, archived from the original (PDF) on 2021-12-30
- Crangle, Edward Fitzpatrick (1994), The Origin and Development of Early Indian Contemplative Practices, Harrassowitz Verlag
- Dogen, Kazuaki (1999), Tanahashi (ed.), Enlightenment Unfolds. The Essential Teachings of Zen Master Dogen, Shambhala
- Dumoulin, Heinrich (2005), Zen Buddhism: A History. Volume 1: India and China, World Wisdom Books, ISBN 978-0-941532-89-1
- Feuerstein, George (1978), Handboek voor Yoga (Dutch translation; English title "Textbook of Yoga"), Ankh-Hermes
- Fischer-Schreiber, Ingrid; Ehrhard, Franz-Karl; Diener, Michael S. (2008), Lexicon Boeddhisme. Wijsbegeerte, religie, psychologie, mystiek, cultuur en literatuur, Asoka
- Fuller-Sasaki, Ruth (2008), The Record of Lin-Ji, University of Hawaii Press
- Gethin, Rupert (1992), The Buddhist Path to Awakening, OneWorld Publications
- Gethin, Rupert (2004), "On the Practice of Buddhist Meditation According to the Pali Nikayas and Exegetical Sources", Buddhismus in Geschichte und Gegenwart, 9: 201–21
- Gokhale, Pradeep P. (2020). The Yogasūtra of Patañjali: A New Introduction to the Buddhist Roots of the Yoga System. Taylor & Francis.
- Gombrich, Richard F. (1997), How Buddhism Began, Munshiram Manoharlal
- Gregory, Peter N. (1991), Sudden and Gradual. Approaches to Enlightenment in Chinese Thought, Delhi: Motilal Banarsidass Publishers Private Limited
- Guenther, Herbert V.; Kawamura, Leslie S. (1975), Mind in Buddhist Psychology: A Translation of Ye-shes rgyal-mtshan's "The Necklace of Clear Understanding" (Kindle ed.), Dharma Publishing
- Johansson, Rune Edvin Anders (1981), Pali Buddhist Texts: Explained to the Beginner, Psychology Press
- Kalupahana, David J. (1992), The Principles of Buddhist Psychology, Delhi: ri Satguru Publications
- Kalupahana, David J. (1994), A history of Buddhist philosophy, Delhi: Motilal Banarsidass Publishers Private Limited
- King, Richard (1995), Early Advaita Vedānta and Buddhism: The Mahāyāna Context of the Gauḍapādīya-kārikā, SUNY Press
- King, Winston L. (1992), Theravada Meditation. The Buddhist Transformation of Yoga, Delhi: Motilal Banarsidass
- Kunsang, Erik Pema (2004), Gateway to Knowledge, Vol. 1, North Atlantic Books
- Lachs, Stuart (2006), The Zen Master in America: Dressing the Donkey with Bells and Scarves
- Lai, Whalen; Cheng, Yu-yin (2008), "Chinese Buddhist Philosophy from Han through Tang", in Mou, Bo (ed.), ?, Routledge
- Loori, John Daido (2006), Sitting with Koans: Essential Writings on Zen Koan Introspection, Wisdom Publications, ISBN 0-86171-369-9
- Lusthaus, Dan (2002), Buddhist Phenomenology: A Philosophical Investigation of Yogacara Buddhism and the Ch'eng Wei-shih Lun, Routledge
- Maezumi, Taizan; Cook, Francis Dojun (2007), "The Eight Awarenesses of the Enlightened Person": Dogen Zenji's Hachidainingaku", in Maezumi, Taizan; Glassman, Bernie (eds.), The Hazy Moon of Enlightenment, Wisdom Publications
- Matsumoto, Shirõ (1997) (1997), The Meaning of "Zen". In Jamie Hubbard (ed.), Pruning the Bodhi Tree: The Storm Over Critical Buddhism (PDF), Honolulu: University of Hawaiʻi Press, pp. 242–250, ISBN 082481908X
- McRae, John (1986), The Northern School and the Formation of Early Chʻan Buddhism, University of Hawaii Press
- Nanamoli, Bhikkhu (trans.) (1995), The Middle Length Discourses of the Buddha: A New Translation of the Majjhima Nikaya, Wisdom Publications, ISBN 0-86171-072-X
- Polak, Grzegorz (2011), Reexamining Jhana: Towards a Critical Reconstruction of Early Buddhist Soteriology, UMCS
- Quli, Natalie (2008), "Multiple Buddhist Modernisms: Jhana in Convert Theravada" (PDF), Pacific World, 10: 225–249
- Rhys-Davids, T.W.; Stede, William, eds. (1921–25), The Pali Text Society's Pali–English dictionary, Pali Text Society)
- Rose, Kenneth (2016), Yoga, Meditation, and Mysticism: Contemplative Universals and Meditative Landmarks, Bloomsbury
- Samuel, Geoffrey (2008). The Origins of Yoga and Tantra: Indic Religions to the Thirteenth Century. Cambridge University Press. ISBN 978-1-139-47021-6.
- Sangpo, Gelong Lodro; Dhammajoti, Bhikkhu K.L. (2012), Abhidharmakosa-Bhasya of Vasubandhu: Volume 3, Motilal Banarsidass
- Sarbacker, Stuart Ray (2021), Tracing the Path of Yoga: The History and Philosophy of Indian Mind-Body Discipline, State University of New York Press
- Schmithausen, Lambert (1981), On some Aspects of Descriptions or Theories of 'Liberating Insight' and 'Enlightenment' in Early Buddhism". In: Studien zum Jainismus und Buddhismus (Gedenkschrift für Ludwig Alsdorf), hrsg. von Klaus Bruhn und Albrecht Wezler, Wiesbaden 1981, 199–250
- Schaik, Sam van (2018), The spirit of Zen, Yale University Press
- Shankman, Richard (2008), The Experience of Samadhi: An In-depth Exploration of Buddhist Meditation, Shambhala
- Sharf, Robert (2014), "Mindfullness and Mindlessness in Early Chan" (PDF), Philosophy East & West, 64 (4): 933–964, doi:10.1353/pew.2014.0074, S2CID 144208166
- Sharf, Robert H. (2015), "Is mindfulness Buddhist? (and why it matters)", Transcultural Psychiatry, 52 (4): 470–484, doi:10.1177/1363461514557561, PMID 25361692, S2CID 18518975
- Stuart-Fox, Martin (1989), "Jhana and Buddhist Scholasticism", Journal of the International Association of Buddhist Studies, 12 (2)
- Suzuki, D.T. (2014), Selected Works of D.T. Suzuki, Volume I: Zen, University of California Press
- Tola, Fernando; Dragonetti, Carmen; Prithipaul, K. Dad (1987), The Yogasūtras of Patañjali on concentration of mind, Motilal Banarsidass
- Vetter, Tilmann (1988), The Ideas and Meditative Practices of Early Buddhism, BRILL
- Vimalaramsi, Bhante (2015), A Guide to Tranquil Wisdom Insight Meditation, Dhamma Sukha Publishing
- Wayman, Alex (1997), "Introduction", Calming the Mind and Discerning the Real: Buddhist Meditation and the Middle View, from the Lam Rim Chen Mo Tson-kha-pa, Motilal Banarsidass Publishers
- Williams, Paul (2000), Buddhist Thought. A complete introduction to the Indian tradition, Routledge
- Wujastyk, Dominik (2011), The Path to Liberation through Yogic Mindfulness in Early Ayurveda. In: David Gordon White (ed.), "Yoga in practice", Princeton University Press
- Wynne, Alexander (2007), The Origin of Buddhist Meditation, Routledge
- Yu, Jimmy (2021), Reimagining Chan Buddhism: Sheng Yen and the Creation of the Dharma Drum Lineage of Chan, Routledge
- Zhu, Rui (2005), "Distinguishing Sōtō and Rinzai Zen: Manas and the Mental Mechanics of Meditation" (PDF), East and West, 55 (3): 426–446, archived from the original (PDF) on 2018-12-14
