= Upekṣā =

Concept of equanimity in Buddhism

Translations of Upekkha
- English: Equanimity, neutral
- Sanskrit: उपेक्षा (IAST: upekṣā)
- Pali: upekkhā
- Burmese: ဥပေက္ခာ (MLCTS: ʔṵ pjɪʔ kʰà)
- Chinese: 捨 (Pinyin: shě)
- Indonesian: ketenangan, keseimbangan batin
- Japanese: 捨 (Rōmaji: sha)
- Khmer: ឧបេក្ខា (UNGEGN: ŭbékkha)
- Sinhala: උපේක්ෂා (upēkshā)
- Tagalog: Upeksa
- Thai: อุเบกขา (RTGS: upekkhaa)
- Vietnamese: xả

Upekṣā, or Upekkhā (Sinhala: උපේක්ෂා, romanized: upekshā) (Pali: 𑀉𑀧𑁂𑀓𑁆𑀔𑀸, romanized: upekkhā) is the virtue of equanimity, found across Indian philosophical traditions. Within Hinduism, upekṣā is a means through which mental stability is cultivated. Within Buddhism, upekṣā is one of the brahmaviharas or "virtues of the "Brahma realm" (brahmaloka). It is one of the wholesome mental factors (kuśala cetasika) cultivated on the Buddhist path to nirvāna through the practice of jhāna.

== Etymology and definitions ==
The term 'upekṣā' comes from the verbal root 'ikṣ' which has the prefix 'upa' added to it.

Monier-Williams provides twelve varied definitions of upekṣā. In the context of smriti texts such as the Mahabharata, Raghuvamsa, Hitopdesa, upekṣā is defined as: overlooking, disregard, negligence, indifference, contempt and abandonment. He notes that lexicrographers define upekṣā as trick or deceit, specifically in the context of war. The four other definitions of upekṣā are endurance, patience, dissent, and regard.

== Buddhism ==
=== Pali Literature ===
Many passages in the Pali Canon and post-canonical commentaries identify upekkhā as an important aspect of spiritual development. It is one of the Four Sublime States of Brahmavihara, which purify mental states capable of counteracting the defilements of lust, aversion, and ignorance. As a Brahmavihara, it is also one of the forty traditionally identified subjects of Buddhist meditation (kammaṭṭhāna). In the Theravada list of ten pāramī (perfections), upekkha is the last-identified bodhisatta practice, and in the Seven Factors of Awakening (bojjhanga), it is the ultimate characteristic to develop.

To practice upekkha is to be unwavering or to stay neutral in the face of the "eight worldy conditions" (aṭṭha loka dhamma): loss and gain, good-repute and ill-repute, praise and censure, and sorrow and happiness .

In the description of meditative samādhi, upekkhā is present in the third and fourth jhāna.

Table: Factors of rūpa jhāna
Cetasika (mental factors)	First jhāna	Second jhāna	Third jhāna	Fourth jhāna
Kāma / Akusala dhamma (sensuality / unskillful qualities)	secluded from; withdrawn	does not occur	does not occur	does not occur
Pīti (rapture)	seclusion-born; pervades body	samādhi-born; pervades body	fades away (along with distress)	does not occur
Sukha (non-sensual pleasure)	seclusion-born; pervades body	samādhi-born; pervades body	pervades physical body	abandoned (no pleasure nor pain)
Vitakka ("applied thought")	accompanies jhāna	unification of awareness free from vitakka and vicāra	does not occur	does not occur
Vicāra ("sustained thought")	accompanies jhāna	unification of awareness free from vitakka and vicāra	does not occur	does not occur
Upekkhāsatipārisuddhi (pure, mindful equanimity)	does not occur	internal confidence	equanimous; mindful	purity of equanimity and mindfulness

In post-canonical text, the "far enemies" of upekkhā are greed and resentment driven by desire and anger, which are mind-states that are in obvious opposition. The "near enemy", the quality which superficially resembles upekkhā but which subtly opposes it, is indifference or apathy.

Buddhaghosa identifies ten canonical contexts for upekkhā: (1) the destruction of the cankers ("six-factored equanimity," based on the six sense bases); (2) a brahmavihārā; (3) a bojjhaṅgā; (4) as arising from a balancing of energy; (5) a "formation" arising from concentration or insight; (6) a vedanā (that is, a synonym for "profitable" adukkham-asukhā); (7) arising from insight from investigation; (8) a "specific neutrality"; (9) "equanimity of jhana" ("impartiality towards even the highest bliss"); and, (10) "purifying equanimity" ("equanimity purified of all opposition").

=== Contemporary exposition ===
Bhikkhu Bodhi, an American monk, wrote:

The real meaning of [upekkha] is equanimity, not indifference in the sense of unconcern for others. As a spiritual virtue, upekkha means equanimity in the face of the fluctuations of worldly fortune. It is evenness of mind, unshakeable freedom of mind, a state of inner equipoise that cannot be upset by gain and loss, honor and dishonor, praise and blame, pleasure and pain. Upekkha is freedom from all points of self-reference; it is indifference only to the demands of the ego-self with its craving for pleasure and position, not to the well-being of one's fellow human beings. True equanimity is the pinnacle of the four social attitudes that the Buddhist texts call the "divine abodes": boundless loving-kindness, compassion, altruistic joy, and equanimity. The last does not override and negate the preceding three, but perfects and consummates them.

== Hinduism ==
The Yoga Sutras identify upekṣā as a means of cultivating a stable mind in verse 1.33. Vacaspati Misra, in his commentary on this verse, states that upekṣā should be cultivated towards those who are 'demeritorious'. Vacaspati Misra argues that when the virtue of upekṣā is cultivated, the 'taint of wrath' towards those who are demeritorius is counterbalanced. Upekṣā is identified in the Yoga Sutras alongside friendliness, compassion, and sympathetic joy.

The virtue of upekṣā is also discussed in Hindu political philosophical treatise. In the Arthashastra, Kautilya recommends that those who are weak ought to imbibe the virtue of upekṣā, tolerating the enemy even when provoked by them.

== See also ==
- Adhiṭṭhāna (resolute determination)
- Apatheia
- Ataraxia
- Brahmavihara
- Dāna (generosity)
- Jhāna
- Khanti (patience)
- Metta (loving-kindness)
- Nekkhamma (renunciation)
- Pañña (wisdom)
- Passaddhi (tranquillity)
- Sacca (truth)
- Vīrya (diligence)
- Samatva, closely related concept in Hinduism
- Vairagya, closely related concept in Hinduism
