= Samatva =

Hindu concept of equanimity

Samatva (Sanskrit: समत्व, also rendered samatvam or samata) is the Hindu concept of equanimity. Its root is sama (सम) meaning – equal or even. Sāmya - meaning equal consideration towards all human beings - is a variant of the word.

== Description ==
All enjoyment is dependent on certain conditions being met, much enjoyment occurs because some accomplish goals, this may be highly relative and dependent. Expectations of any benefit, that can be of any material gain, according to Bhagavad Gita is removed from ourselves. Knowledge of ourselves is in balance, the fruits of actions are changeable, unnecessary, unreal, unimportant, they lack what can uplift, they aren't furthering dignity, love and happiness and are transitory physically, mostly unrelated to knowledge and the true self.

== See also ==
- Brahmavihara
- Compassion § Hinduism
- Daya
- Karuṇā
- The Five Yamas of Yoga
- Ātman (Hinduism)
- Chakra § The seven chakra system
- Ahimsa § Hinduism
- Mettā
- Samadhana, related to the four means of liberation Sadhana Chatushtaya
- Upekkhā
- Vairagya
