= Pīti =

Mental factor in Buddhism

Pīti in Pali (Sanskrit: Prīti) is a mental factor (Pali: cetasika, Sanskrit: caitasika) associated with the development of jhāna (Sanskrit: dhyāna) in Buddhist meditation. According to Buddhadasa Bhikkhu, piti is a stimulating, exciting and energizing and dry quality, as opposed to the calmness of sukha.

== Definition ==
Piti is a joyful saṅkhāra (formation) associated with no object, so the practitioner is not attaining it by desire. It is often translated into the English word "rapture" and is distinguished from the longer-lasting meditative "joy" or "happiness" (Pali, Sanskrit: sukha) which is a subtler feeling which arises alongside pīti.

== Mental factor in meditation ==
In the commentarial tradition on Buddhist meditation, the development of jhāna (Sanskrit: dhyāna) is described as the development of five mental factors (cetasika) that counteract the five hindrances: (Note: See, for instance, Samādhaṅga Sutta (a/k/a, Pañcaṅgikasamādhi Sutta, AN 5.28) (Thanissaro, 1997b).)

Table: Rūpa jhāna
| Cetasika (mental factors) | First jhāna | Second jhāna | Third jhāna | Fourth jhāna |
| Kāma / Akusala dhamma (sensuality / unskillful qualities) | secluded from; withdrawn | does not occur | does not occur | does not occur |
| Pīti (rapture) | seclusion-born; pervades body | samādhi-born; pervades body | fades away (along with distress) | does not occur |
| Sukha (non-sensual pleasure) | seclusion-born; pervades body | samādhi-born; pervades body | pervades physical body | abandoned (no pleasure nor pain) |
| Vitakka ("applied thought") | accompanies jhāna | unification of awareness free from vitakka and vicāra | does not occur | does not occur |
| Vicāra ("sustained thought") | accompanies jhāna | unification of awareness free from vitakka and vicāra | does not occur | does not occur |
| Upekkhāsatipārisuddhi (pure, mindful equanimity) | does not occur | internal confidence | equanimous; mindful | purity of equanimity and mindfulness |
Sources:

1. vitakka ("applied thought") counteracts sloth and torpor (lethargy and drowsiness)
2. vicāra ("sustained thought") counteracts doubt (uncertainty)
3. pīti (rapture) counteracts ill-will (malice)
4. sukha ("non-sensual pleasure") counteracts restlessness-worry (excitation and anxiety)
5. ekaggata ("one-pointedness") counteracts sensory desire

Both pīti and sukha are born of bodily seclusion and mental quietude in first jhāna, then are born of focused concentration (samādhi) in the second jhāna but only sukha is sustained in the third jhāna while pīti fades away in the course of cultivating pure, mindful equanimity (upekkhāsatipārisuddhi).

The 5th century CE Visuddhimagga distinguishes between pīti and sukha in the following experiential manner:

And wherever the two are associated, happiness [here, Ñāṇamoli's translation of pīti] is the contentedness at getting a desirable object, and bliss [sukha] is the actual experiencing of it when got. Where there is happiness [pīti] there is bliss (pleasure) [sukha]; but where there is bliss [sukha] there is not necessarily happiness [pīti]. Happiness is included in the formations aggregate; bliss is included in the feeling aggregate. If a man exhausted in a desert saw or heard about a pond on the edge of a wood, he would have happiness; if he went into the wood's shade and used the water, he would have bliss....

== Fivefold classification ==
As the meditator experiences tranquillity (samatha), one of five kinds of physical pleasure (piti) will arise. These are:

- Weak rapture only causes piloerection.
- Short rapture evocates some thunder "from time to time".
- Going down rapture explodes inside the body, like waves.
- Exalting rapture "makes the body jump to the sky".
- Fulfilling rapture seems to be a huge flood of a mountain stream.

Note that only the last two are considered piti, specifically. The first four are a preparation for the final stage, which is the jhanic factor.

== See also ==
- Samatha (tranquility of the mind)
- Jhāna (absorption)
- Sukha (happiness/bliss, conascent (sahajāta) with piti during first two jhanas)
- Upekkha (equanimity)
