= Vitarka-vicāra =

Buddhist meditative practices

Translations of Vitarka
- English: thought applied thought inquiry initial inquiry applied attention initial mental application initial intellectual investigative intent reflection
- Sanskrit: वितर्क
- Pali: vitakka
- Burmese: ဝိစာရ
- Chinese: 尋 (T) / 寻 (S)
- Indonesian: penempelan awal penempatan awal pikiran
- Japanese: 尋 (Rōmaji: jin)
- Korean: 심 (RR: sim)
- Tibetan: རྟོག་པ། (Wylie: rtog pa; THL: tokpa)
- Thai: วิตก (RTGS: witok)
- Vietnamese: Tầm (tìm)

Translations of Vicāra
- English: examination investigation subsequent discursive reasoning and thought investigating what has been focused on by vitakka
- Sanskrit: vicāra, विचार
- Pali: vicāra
- Chinese: 伺 (T) / 伺 (S)
- Indonesian: penempelan terus-menerus penempatan sinambung pikiran
- Japanese: 伺 (Rōmaji: shi)
- Korean: 사 (RR: sa)
- Tibetan: དཔྱོད་པ། (Wylie: dpyod pa; THL: chöpa)
- Thai: วิจาร (RTGS: wichan)
- Vietnamese: Tứ (Hán Việt): dò xét

In Buddhism, vitarka (वितर्क; Pali: 𑀯𑀺𑀢𑀓𑁆𑀓, romanized: vitakka; Tibetan: རྟོག་པ།, Wylie: rtog pa, THL: tokpa), "applied thought,"(initial) inquiry," and vicāra (विचार and 𑀯𑀺𑀘𑀸𑀭; Tibetan: དཔྱོད་པ།, Wylie: dpyod pa, THL: chöpa), "investigating what has been focused on by vitakka, are qualities or elements of the first dhyāna or jhāna.

In the Pali canon, Vitakka-vicāra form one expression, which refers to directing one's thought or attention on an object (vitarka) and investigating it (vicāra), "breaking it down into its functional components" to understand it [and] distinguishing the multitude of conditioning factors implicated in a phenomenal event."

The later Theravada commentarial tradition, as represented by Buddhaghosa's Visuddhimagga, interprets vitarka and vicāra as the initial and sustained application of attention to a meditational object, which culminates in the stilling of the mind. According to Fox and Bucknell vitarka-vicāra may also refer to "the normal process of discursive thought," which is quieted through absorption in the second jhāna.

== Etymology ==
Vitarka (Sanskrit: वितर्क ) - "thoughts," "applied thought," "applied attention," "inquiry," "initial inquiry," "initial mental application, or initial intellectual investigative intent." Its roots are:

- वि vi, a prefix to verbs and nouns it expresses;
- तर्क tarka, "reasoning, inquiry."

Vitarka may refer to mental activities manifested both in normal consciousness and in the first stage of dhyana. According to Buswell and Lopez, in general, it means "thought," "applied thought," or "distracted thoughts." According to Bhikkhu Bodhi, "In the Suttas, the word Vittaka is often used in the loose sense of thought, but in the Abhidhamma it is used in a precise technical sense to mean the mental factor that mounts or directs the mind towards an object."

Vicāra (Sanskrit: विचार) - "investigation," "subsequent discursive reasoning and thought, i.e., investigating what has been focused on by vitakka." Its roots are:

- वि vi, a prefix used with verbs and nouns;
- चर् car, to move, roam, obtain knowledge of
- The term is cognate with the Tamil vicāram (Tamil: விசாரம்; [ʋitɕaːɾɐm]), which similarly denotes philosophical inquiry or investigation, and is related to the modern Tamil term for a legal or formal inquiry, vicāraṇai (விசாரணை; [ʋitɕaːɾɐɳaɪ]).

Vitarka investigates things roughly, while vicāra investigates things exactly. According to Dan Lusthaus, vicāra is "subsequent discursive reasoning and thought, i.e., investigating what has been focused on by vitakka."

In Patanjali's Yoga Sutras verse 1.17, vitarka is described as deliberation and vicāra as reflection, both occurring in samprajnata samadhi.

== Mental factors in meditation ==
Table: Factors of rūpa jhāna
Cetasika (mental factors)	First jhāna	Second jhāna	Third jhāna	Fourth jhāna
Kāma / Akusala dhamma (sensuality / unskillful qualities)	secluded from; withdrawn	does not occur	does not occur	does not occur
Pīti (rapture)	seclusion-born; pervades body	samādhi-born; pervades body	fades away (along with distress)	does not occur
Sukha (non-sensual pleasure)	seclusion-born; pervades body	samādhi-born; pervades body	pervades physical body	abandoned (no pleasure nor pain)
Vitakka ("applied thought")	accompanies jhāna	unification of awareness free from vitakka and vicāra	does not occur	does not occur
Vicāra ("sustained thought")	accompanies jhāna	unification of awareness free from vitakka and vicāra	does not occur	does not occur
Upekkhāsatipārisuddhi (pure, mindful equanimity)	does not occur	internal confidence	equanimous; mindful	purity of equanimity and mindfulness

Vitarka and vicāra are two of the mental factors (cetasika) present during the first dhyāna (Pali: jhāna), and which are absent in the higher jhanas. According to Shankman, "two distinct meanings are suggested [...] one indicating mental activities such as thinking, reflecting, and so on, and the other referring to the mental activity of connecting and sustaining the attention on a meditation object."

=== Investigation ===
According to Dan Lusthaus, vitarka-vicāra is analytic scrutiny, a form of prajna. It "involves focusing on [something] and then breaking it down into its functional components" to understand it, "distinguishing the multitude of conditioning factors implicated in a phenomenal event."

According to Polak, in the Pali Canon vitarka and vicāra are mostly related to thinking about the sense-impressions, which give rise to further egoistical thought and action. The stilling of this thinking fits into the Buddhist training of sense-withdrawal and right effort, culminating in the equanimity and mindfulness of dhyana-practice.

In Tibetan Buddhism, Ulrich Timme Kragh explains vitarka (discernment) and vicāra (discursiveness), as understood by the Yogācārabhūmi-Śāstra, thus: discernment is "the cognitive operation that is responsible for ascertaining what is perceived by the senses by initially labeling it with a name", while discursiveness is "the subsequent conceptual operation of deciding whether the perceived sense-object is desirable and what course of action one might want to take in relation to it".

According to Naichen, in Mahayana Buddhism, "Samādhi with general examination and specific in-depth investigation means getting rid of the not virtuous dharmas, such as greedy desire and hatred, to stay in joy and pleasure caused by nonarising, and to enter the first meditation and fully dwell in it."

=== Commentatorial tradition ===
According to Stuart-Fox, the commentarial tradition regards the qualities of the first jhāna to be antidotes to the five hindrances. Abhidhamma separated vitarka from vicāra, and ekaggatā (onepointedness) was added to the description of the first jhāna to give an equal number of five antidotes for the five hindrances. (Note: Stuart-Fox further notes that vitarka, being discursive thought, will do very little as an anti-dote for sloth and torpor, reflecting the inconsistencies which were introduced by the scholastics.)

While initially simply referring to thought, which is present at the onset of dhyāna, the terms vitarka and vicāra were re-interpreted by the developing Abhidharma and commentarial tradition. In Theravāda, vitarka is one of the mental factors that apprehend the quality of an object. It is the "initial application of attention" or the mind to its object, while vicāra is the sustained application of the mind on an object. Vitarka is regarded in the Theravāda tradition as an antidote for thina-middha (sloth and torpor), one of the five hindrances.

=== Normal process of discursive thought ===
According to Roderick S. Bucknell, "vitakka-vicāra, the factor that particularly characterizes the first jhāna, is probably nothing other than the normal process of discursive thought, the familiar but usually unnoticed stream of mental imagery and verbalization". (Note: Bucknell refers to: * Martin Stuart-Fox, "Jhana and Buddhist Scholasticism," Journal of the International Association of Buddhist Studies 12.2 (1989): 79-110 * Paul Griffiths, "Buddhist Jhana: A form-critical study," Religion 13 (1983): 55-68. See also Bhante Sujato, Why vitakka doesn’t mean ‘thinking’ in jhana)

Martin Stuart-Fox explains, referring to Rhys Davids and Stede, when vitarka-vicāra are mentioned in tandem, they are one expression, "to cover all varieties of thinking, including sustained and focused thought. It is thinking in this inclusive sense that the meditator suppresses through concentration when he attains one-ness of mind and thus moves from first to second jhāna".

=== Yogacara ===
The Yogacara term manas means both "intentionality" or 'self-centered thinking', and "discriminative thinking" (vikalpa). The process of meditation aims at "non-thinking," stopping both these cognitive processes.

== Vitarka Mudrā ==
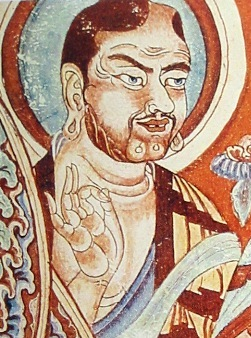
Vitarka mudrā, Tarim Basin, 9th century

The Vitarka mudrā, or "mudra of discussion," expresses vitarka, by joining the tips of the thumb and index finger while keeping the other fingers straight. This mudra has many variants in Mahāyāna Buddhism, and is also known as Prajñāliṅganabhinaya and Vyākhyāna mudrā ("mudra of explanation"). The Vitarka mudrā is thought to symbolize teaching and instruction and is associated with significant moments in the Buddha's life, such as his first discourse on the Four Noble Truths and the miracle at Sravasti, where he revealed his divine form. Initially depicted with the right hand, since the 8th century CE, it has also been represented using the left hand.

== See also ==
- Mental factors (Buddhism)
- Sananda Samadhi

== Sources ==
- Arbel, Keren (2017), Early Buddhist Meditation: The Four Jhanas as the Actualization of Insight, Routledge, doi:10.4324/9781315676043, ISBN 9781317383994
- Berzin, Alexander (2006), Primary Minds and the 51 Mental Factors
- Bhikkhu Bodhi (2003), A Comprehensive Manual of Abhidhamma, Pariyatti Publishing
- Bronkhorst, Johannes (1993-01-01). The Two Traditions of Meditation in Ancient India. Motilal Banarsidass Publishing House. ISBN 978-81-208-1114-0.
- Bucknell, Roderick S. (Winter 1993), "Reinterpreting the Jhanas", Journal of the International Association of Buddhist Studies, 16 (2)
- Buswell; Lopez (2013), The Princeton Dictionary of Buddhism, Princeton University Press
- Chen, Naichen (2017), The Great Prajna Paramita Sutra, Volume 1, Wheatmark
- Fox, Martin Stuart (1989), "Jhana and Buddhist Scholasticism", Journal of the International Association of Buddhist Studies, 12 (2)
- Guenther, Herbert V.; Kawamura, Leslie S. (1975), Mind in Buddhist Psychology: A Translation of Ye-shes rgyal-mtshan's "The Necklace of Clear Understanding" (Kindle ed.), Dharma Publishing
- Kalupahana, David J. (1992), The Principles of Buddhist Psychology, Delhi: ri Satguru Publications
- Keown, Damien (2004), A Dictionary of Buddhism, Oxford University Press
- Kheminda, Ashin (2019). Abhidhammatthasaṅgaha: Manual Abhidhamma - Ajaran Tentang Realitas Hakiki, Jilid 2: Faktor-Faktor-Mental (in Indonesian) (Cetakan II ed.). Jakarta Barat: Yayasan Dhammavihari. ISBN 978-623-94342-7-4.
- Kunsang, Erik Pema (2004), Gateway to Knowledge, Vol. 1, North Atlantic Books
- Kusaladhamma, Ashin (2022). Untaian Dhamma Tematik - Tema Pertama (Buku 1) (PDF) (in Indonesian) (Pertama ed.). Jakarta Barat: Yayasan Satipaṭṭhāna Indonesia.
- Lusthaus, Dan (2002), Buddhist Phenomenology: A Philosophical Investigation of Yogacara Buddhism and the Ch'eng Wei-shih Lun, Routledge
- Polak, Grzegorz (2011), Reexamining Jhana: Towards a Critical Reconstruction of Early Buddhist Soteriology, UMCS
- Rhys-Davids, T.W.; Stede, William, eds. (1921–25), The Pali Text Society's Pali–English dictionary, Pali Text Society)
- Sangpo, Gelong Lodro; Dhammajoti, Bhikkhu K.L. (2012), Abhidharmakosa-Bhasya of Vasubandhu: Volume 1, Motilal Banarsidass
- Shankman, Richard (2008), The Experience of Samadhi, Shambhala Publications
- Wayman, Alex (1997), "Introduction", Calming the Mind and Discerning the Real: Buddhist Meditation and the Middle View, from the Lam Rim Chen Mo Tson-kha-pa, Motilal Banarsidass Publishers
- Zhu, Rui (2005). "Distinguishing Sōtō and Rinzai Zen: Manas and the Mental Mechanics of Meditation". Philosophy East and West. 55 (3): 426–446. doi:10.1353/pew.2005.0031. ISSN 0031-8221. JSTOR 4487969.
