= Faith in Hinduism =

Sanskrit term, meaning faith; used in Hinduism

Śraddhā (Sanskrit: श्रद्धा, pronounced [ˈɕɾɐd̪.d̪ʱɑː]) is a Sanskrit term conventionally translated into English as "faith," though scholars of Indian religions have long noted that the two terms are not fully equivalent. Indologist Minoru Hara's philological study of the term traced its semantic range across Vedic and classical Sanskrit literature, observing that śraddhā denotes something closer to trustful confidence directed toward ritual efficacy and sacred authority. Its meaning varies across textual and philosophical contexts. A common understanding is that śraddhā refers to the firm conviction that a given practice leads to spiritual perfection, and is therefore the correct course of action to follow.

The term figures importantly in the literature, teachings, and discourse of Hinduism, Jainism, and Buddhism. Sri Aurobindo describes śraddhā as "the soul's belief in the Divine's existence, wisdom, power, love, and grace". Without diacritical marks, it is usually written as shraddha.

Within Hinduism, having faith means one maintains trust in god, scriptures, dharma, and the path of liberation (moksha). The Brihadranyaka Upanishad (3.9.21) states that "the resting ground of faith is the heart", emphasising that to have faith is to follow ones heart and intuition.

Within Hinduism, a key understanding of faith is maintaining trust in the scriptures. Hindus believe that it is not possible to understand or experience god directly with human senses, and so god's presence is inferred through descriptions in the scriptures.

An example of this can be seen in Brihadaranyak Upanishad 3.8.9:

O Gargi, the sun and moon are held in their positions; under the mighty rule of this Immutable; O Gargi, heaven and earth maintain their positions; under the mighty rule of this immutable.

The teacher Ammachi describes it as the "constant alertness arising from Love", and when choosing a single word to translate it into English, has used "awareness". Other writers have also described the concept with emphasis on the intersection of faith and mindfulness, and it has been translated in this vein with words such as "diligence".

One of the key pillars which supports faith in Hinduism is bhakti. Bhakti means intense and devotional love towards god, and together with faith, supports the path towards moksha, the ultimate goal of life within the Hindu belief system.

== Etymology ==
Śraddhā derives from Sanskrit roots which combines śrat (heart, or that which is true) with dhā (to place or hold), suggesting that trust is grounded in the heart. Śraddhā has a range of related meanings rather than a single fixed translation. Depending on the context, it has been translated not just as "faith" but also as "longing," "desire" or "high regard." For example, in the context of charity giving, it is closely linked to "anasūyā", meaning giving without resentment or envy towards the recipient.

== Śraddhā in the Bhagavad Gita ==
In Bhagavad Gita, the term śraddhã is mentioned 17 times across eight chapters, emphasizing its significance. in verse 3.31, Krishna tells Arjuna that those who faithfully adhere to his teachings, have śraddhã (faith or trust) in him and are not jealous, attain liberation from the bondage of karma. This contrasts śraddhã with asuya (envy or jealousy), indicating that when one has śraddhã, they do not find fault with or envy others. This suggests that spiritual practitioners should cultivate śraddhã and avoid jealousy, ultimately bridging the gap between self and others.

Verse 4.39 emphasizes śraddhã as crucial for acquiring jnana (knowledge). In verses 6.39-6.47, Krishna underscores the interconnectedness of śraddhã, jñāna, and abhyasa (diligent effort) in the journey toward self-realization. Krishna assures Arjuna that with śraddhã and sincere effort, one will attain spiritual success despite setbacks. Verse 9.22 signifies the role of śraddhã in bhakti yoga, stressing unwavering faith and single-minded focus on the divine. In verse 9.23, Krishna emphasizes his acceptance of various forms of worship offered with genuine faith and devotion:

Those who are devoted to other gods and worship them with faith actually worship me alone, Kaunteya, but not in the manner that is properly ordained.

— Bhagavad Gita, Verse 9.23

== See also ==
- Shraddha
- Faith in Buddhism
