= Nandita Adhiya =

Indian cricketer (born 1978)

Nandita Adhiya (born 6 January 1978) is a Gujarati cricketer. She played for Saurashtra women and West Zone women. She has played 27 Limited over matches and 10 Women's Twenty20.
