= Shraddha Chavan =

Indian cricketer (born 1988)

Personal information
- Full name: Shraddha Satyawan Chavan
- Born: 6 October 1988 (age 38); Mumbai, India
- Batting: Right-handed
- Bowling: Right-arm fast-medium
- Role: Bowler
- Source: CricArchive, 3 March 2019

Shraddha Satyawan Chavan (born 6 October 1988) is a Maharashtrian cricketer. She has played for Mumbai and West Zone. She has played 18 Limited over matches and 15 Women's Twenty20.
