= Ekaggata =

Pali Buddhist term

Translations of Ekaggata
- English: one-pointedness, concentration, unification, unification of mind
- Sanskrit: ekāgratā
- Pali: ekaggata
- Burmese: ဧကဂ္ဂတာ, သမာဓိ
- Chinese: 一境性
- Thai: เอกัคคตา (RTGS: ekakkhata)
- Vietnamese: nhất hành, nhất điểm

Ekaggatā (Pali; Sanskrit: ekāgratā, एकाग्रता, "one-pointedness") is a Pali Buddhist term, meaning tranquility of mind or one-pointedness, but also "unification of mind."

According to the Theravada-tradition, in their reinterpretation of jhana as one-pointed concentration, this mental factor is the primary component in all jhānas and the essence of concentration or samādhi. One-pointedness temporarily inhibits sensual desire, a necessary condition for any meditative attainment. Ekaggatā exercises the function of closely contemplating the object, the salient characteristic of jhāna, but it cannot perform this function alone. It requires the joint action of the other four jhāna factors each performing its own special function: vitakka, vicāra, pīti, and sukha.

Ekaggatā is identified within the Buddhist teachings as:

- One of the seven universal mental factors within the Theravada abhidharma teachings.
- One of the qualities associated with the second jhāna, according to the Pali Canon.
- Antidote to sensory desire (kāmacchanda) within the five hindrances.

== Etymology ==
Ekaggatā (Pali) (Sanskrit Ekāgratā, एकाग्रता) means:

- "one-pointedness", or the state (-tā) of having one (eka) point (agga or agra);
- "unification of mind," in which mind becomes very still but does not merge with the object of attention.

== Definition ==
Theravada monk Bhikkhu Bodhi states:

This is the unification of the mind on its object. Although this factor comes to prominence in the jhānas, where it functions as a jhāna factor, the Abhidhamma teaches that the germ of that capacity for mental unification is present in all types of consciousness, even the most rudimentary. It there functions as the factor which fixes the mind on its object. One-pointedness has non-wandering or non-distraction as its characteristic. Its function is to conglomerate or unite the associated states.

Bhikkhu Bodhi also notes that deeper, more profound concentration (versus the subtle) concentration causes peace. This is thought to arise from and is founded in happiness.

Nina van Gorkom explains:

Ekaggatā, part of mental factors, allows one to refine one's focus and to settle onto single object. This refinement occurs by separating senses into the 6 groups of auditory, visual, olfactory, kinesthetic, gustatory and thought aspects of perception.

The Atthasālinī (1, Part IV, Chapter 1. 118, 119) elaborates ekaggatā (in the context of sammā-samādhi):

This concentration, known as one-pointedness of mind, has non-scattering (of itself) or non-distraction (of associated states) as characteristic, the welding together of the coexistent states as function, as water kneads bath-powder into a paste, and peace of mind or knowledge as manifestation. For it has been said: 'He who is concentrated knows, sees according to the truth.' It is distinguished by having ease (sukha) (usually) as a proximate cause. Like the steadiness of a lamp in the absence of wind, so should steadfastness of mind be understood.

Ajahn Sucitto further explains:

This is the factor of absorption that arises dependent on bringing to mind, non-involvement and evaluation. It occurs in meditation when the quality of ease has calmed rapture and the mental energy; the energy of focusing and the bodily energy are in harmony. The resultant merging of mind and body is experienced as a firmness in awareness, which is hence not penetrated by sense-impressions.

Yet, Richard Shankman notes that ekaggata also means "unification of mind," in which mind becomes very still but does not merge with the object of attention, and is thus able to observe and gain insight into the changing flow of experience.

== See also ==
- Arupajhana
- Buddhist meditation
- Jhana
- Five Hindrances
- Mental factors (Buddhism)
- Samadhi (Buddhism)

== Sources ==
- Bhikkhu Bodhi (2012), A Comprehensive Manual of Abhidhamma: The Abhidhammattha Sangaha (Vipassana Meditation and the Buddha's Teachings), Independent Publishers Group Kindle Edition
- Nina van Gorkom (2010), ''Cetasikas'', Zolag //links broken
- Shankman, Richard (2008), The Experience of Samadhi, Shambhala Publications
