= Equanimity =

State of psychological stability and composure

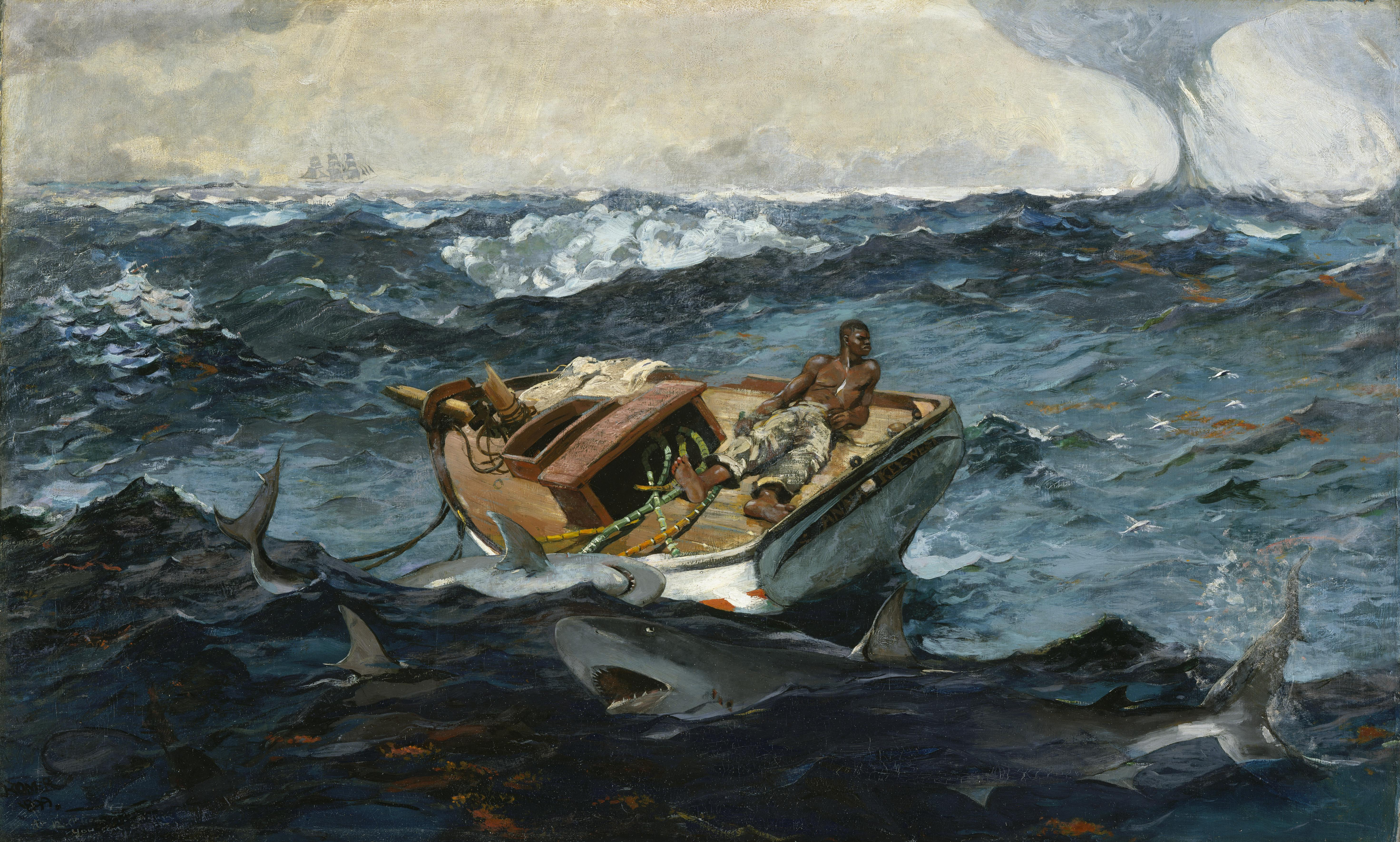
The Gulf Stream by Winslow Homer (1899)

Equanimity is a state of psychological stability and composure which is undisturbed by the experience of or exposure to emotions, pain, or other phenomena that may otherwise cause a loss of mental balance. The virtue and value of equanimity is extolled and advocated by a number of major religions and ancient philosophies.

== Etymology ==
From French équanimité, from Latin aequanimitatem (nom. aequanimitas) "evenness of mind, calmness," from aequus "even, level" (see equal) + animus "mind, spirit" (see animus). Meaning "evenness of temper" in English is from 1610s.

== Religion ==
=== Indian religions ===
==== Hinduism ====
In Hinduism the term for equanimity is समत्व samatvam (also rendered samatva or samata).

In Chapter Two, Verse 48 of the Bhagavad Gita one reads: yoga-sthaḥ kuru karmāṇi saṅgaṁ tyaktvā dhanañ-jaya siddhy-asiddhyoḥ samo bhūtvā samatvaṁ yoga ucyate. Srila Prabhupada translates this as: "Perform your duty equipoised, O Arjuna, abandoning all attachment to success or failure. Such equanimity is called yoga."

In his book Samatvam – The Yoga of Equanimity, Swami Sivananda states:

An aspirant who treads the path to samatvam must make every effort to acquire the following essential qualities: Viveka, discrimination; vairagya, dispassion; shadsampat, the six virtues (shama, mental calmness and control; dama, restraint of the senses; uparati, sense withdrawal or pratyahara; titiksha, endurance; shraddha, faith and samadhana, mental balance); and an intense desire for liberation, mumukshutva. In order to possess the virtue of Samatvam, he will also need to dedicate himself to steadying the mind every moment of his yoga career...

==== Yoga ====
Another Sanskrit term for equanimity is upekṣhā. This is the term used by Patanjali in his Yoga Sutras (1.33). Here upekṣhā is considered to be one of the four sublime attitudes, along with loving-kindness (maitri), compassion (karuṇā), and joy (mudita). It is related to the idea of vairagya or "dispassion". The Upeksha Yoga school foregrounds equanimity as the most important tenet of a yoga practice.

In many Yoga traditions, the virtue of equanimity can be one of the results attained through regular meditation, combined with regular practice of pranayama, asanas, and mental disciplines, which clear the mind and bring one inexorably toward a state of health and balance.

==== Buddhism ====
In Buddhism, equanimity (Pali: upekkhā; Sanskrit: upekṣā) is one of the four sublime attitudes and is considered:

Neither a thought nor an emotion, it is the steady conscious realization of reality's transience. It is the ground for wisdom and freedom and the protector of compassion and love. While some may think of equanimity as dry neutrality or cool aloofness, mature equanimity produces a radiance and warmth of being. The Buddha described a mind filled with equanimity as "abundant, exalted, immeasurable, without hostility and ill-will."

Equanimity can also be cultivated through meditation.

Meditation is a contemplative practice that develops equanimity, allowing people to face extreme states of mind or whatever arises at the present moment. During the meditative state, meditators can practice the technique called "single-pointed concentration" where the practitioner pays attention to one thought or emotion in the present moment and notices how the feeling is arising. This leads to awareness of the moment. With time and practice, it trains the mind to go from "ordinary conceptual modes of operation to greater stillness and equanimity.”

In Vipassanā meditation, practitioners can come to understand and see clearly into the nature of reality, the impermanence of all experience. From this newly developed perspective of equanimity, the mind becomes less easily disturbed and suffers less from unexpected conditions and emotional states. Meditation can train the mind to be sensitive and flexible, which results in developing and maintaining a state of composure, peace, and balance.

=== Abrahamic religions ===
==== Judaism ====
Many Jewish thinkers highlight the importance of equanimity (Menuhat ha-Nefesh or Yishuv ha-Da'at) as a necessary foundation for moral and spiritual development. The virtue of equanimity receives particular attention in the writings of rabbis Rabbi Yisroel Bal Shem Tov and Rabbi Simcha Zissel Ziv.

==== Christianity ====
Samuel Johnson defined equanimity as "evenness of mind, neither elated nor depressed." In Christian philosophy, equanimity is considered essential for carrying out the virtues of modesty, gentleness, contentment, temperance, and charity. In Johnson's essays, divine providence guides all circumstance, whether opportune or inopportune, and as such Christian equanimity is viewed as a form of submission to the will of God.

==== Islam ====
The word “Islam” is derived from the Arabic word aslama, which denotes the peace that comes from total surrender and acceptance. One of the Names of God in Islam is Al-Haleem which means the most forebearing, as to denote God's mercy and forgiveness of the transgressions of His servants. A Muslim may experientially behold that everything happening is meant to be, and stems from the ultimate wisdom of God; hence, being a Muslim can therefore be understood to mean that one is in a state of equanimity.

==== Baha'i ====
The voluminous Writings of the Baha'i Faith are filled with thousands of references to divine attributes, of which equanimity is one. Similar in intent and more frequently used than "equanimity" in the Baha'i Writings are "detachment" and "selflessness" which dispose of human beings to free themselves from excessive reactions to the changes and chances of the world. Humanity is called upon to show complete and sublime detachment from aught else but God, from all that is in the heavens and all that is on earth, from the material world, and from the promptings of their interests and passions. Related concepts include faith, the concept of growing through suffering and being tested, fortitude under trials, dignity, patience, prudence, moderation, freedom from material things, radiant acquiescence, wisdom, and evanescence. Baha'u'llah, the Central Personage of the Baha'i Faith, wrote: "Until a being setteth his foot in the plane of sacrifice, he is bereft of every favour and grace; and this plane of sacrifice is the realm of dying to the self, that the radiance of the living God may then shine forth. The martyr’s field is the place of detachment from self, that the anthems of eternity may be upraised. Do all ye can to become wholly weary of self, and bind yourselves to that Countenance of Splendours; and once ye have reached such heights of servitude, ye will find, gathered within your shadow, all created things. This is boundless grace, the highest sovereignty; this is the life that dieth not. All else save this is at the last but manifest perdition and great loss."

The highly revered Son of Baha'u'llah, 'Abdu'l-Baha, was an exile and prisoner along with His Father, for more than forty years facing a torrent of various hardships. It is written about him: "So imperturbable was ‘Abdu’l-Bahá’s equanimity that, while rumors were being bruited about that He might be cast into the sea, or exiled to Fizán in Tripolitania, or hanged on the gallows, He, to the amazement of His friends and the amusement of His enemies, was to be seen planting trees and vines in the garden of His house, whose fruits when the storm had blown over, He would bid His faithful gardener, Ismá’íl Áqá, pluck and present to those same friends and enemies on the occasion of their visits to Him." When in London, He was asked about His time in prison and said: "Freedom is not a matter of place. It is a condition. I was thankful for the prison, and the lack of liberty was very pleasing to me, for those days were passed in the path of service, under the utmost difficulties and trials, bearing fruits and results... Unless one accepts dire vicissitudes, he will not attain... When one is released from the prison of self, that is indeed release, for that is the greater prison... The afflictions which come to humanity sometimes tend to centre the consciousness upon the limitations, and this is a veritable prison. Release comes by making of the will a Door through which the confirmations of the Spirit come." Asked about this He said: "The confirmations of the Spirit are all those powers and gifts which some are born with (and which men sometimes call genius), but for which others have to strive with infinite pains. They come to that man or woman who accepts his life with radiant acquiescence. Radiant acquiescence—that was the quality with which we all suddenly seemed inspired as ‘Abdu’l-Bahá bade us good-bye."

The following quote by 'Abdu'l-Baha offers a perspective aimed at cultivating equanimity. He wrote: "Grieve thou not over the troubles and hardships of this nether world, nor be thou glad in times of ease and comfort, for both shall pass away. This present life is even as a swelling wave, or a mirage, or drifting shadows. Could ever a distorted image on the desert serve as refreshing waters? No, by the Lord of Lords! Never can reality and the mere semblance of reality be one, and wide is the difference between fancy and fact, between truth and the phantom thereof. Know thou that the Kingdom is the real world, and this nether place is only its shadow stretching out. A shadow hath no life of its own; its existence is only a fantasy, and nothing more; it is but images reflected in water and seeming as pictures to the eye. Rely upon God. Trust in Him. Praise Him, and call Him continually to mind. He verily turneth trouble into ease, and sorrow into solace, and toil into utter peace. He verily hath dominion over all things. If thou wouldst hearken to my words, release thyself from the fetters of whatsoever cometh to pass. Nay rather, under all conditions, thank thou thy loving Lord, and yield up thine affairs unto His Will that worketh as He pleaseth. This verily is better for thee than all else in either world."

== Philosophy ==
=== Pyrrhonism ===
In Pyrrhonism the term used for equanimity is ataraxia, which means to be unperturbed. Ataraxia is the goal of Pyrrhonist practice.

=== Taoism ===
Although equanimity in itself is not singled out as a practice or an effect of philosophical Daoism, Wu wei is a related concept and can be thought to be a broader term which also includes equanimity.

=== Stoicism ===
Equanimity is central to Stoic ethics and psychology. The Greek Stoics use the word apatheia or ataraxia whereas the Roman Stoics used the Latin word aequanimitas. The Roman Emperor Marcus Aurelius's Meditations details a philosophy of service and duty, describing how to find and preserve equanimity in the midst of conflict by following nature as a source of guidance and inspiration. His adoptive father Antoninus Pius's last word was uttered when the tribune of the night-watch came to ask him for the night's password. Pius chose "Equanimity" ("Æquanimitas.").

=== Epicureanism ===
Epicurus believed that what he called "pleasure" (ἡδονή) was the greatest good, but that the way to attain such pleasure was to live modestly, to gain knowledge of the workings of the world, and to limit one's desires. This would lead the practitioner of Epicureanism to attain ataraxia (equanimity).
