= Cariyāpiṭaka =

Buddhist scripture

- SuttaCentral; OpenTipitaka
- Type: Canonical text
- Parent: Khuddaka Nikāya
- Attribution: Bhāṇaka
- Aṭṭhakathā: Paramatthadīpanī (Cariyāpiṭaka-aṭṭhakathā)
- Commentator: Dhammapāla
- Abbreviation: Cp

The Cariyapitaka (cariyāpiṭaka; where cariya is Pali for "conduct" or "proper conduct" and pitaka is usually translated as "basket"; abbrev. Cp) is a Buddhist scripture, part of the Pali Canon of Theravada Buddhism. It is included there in the Sutta Pitaka's Khuddaka Nikaya, usually as the last of fifteen books. It is a short verse work that includes thirty-five accounts of the Buddha's former lives (similar to Jataka tales) when he as a bodhisattva exhibited behaviors known as "perfections," prerequisites to buddhahood. This canonical text, along with the Apadana and Buddhavamsa, is believed to be a late addition to the Pali Canon and has been described as "hagiographical."

== Overview ==
In the first story (Cp. I), the Buddha says he will illustrate his practice of the perfections (Pali, pāramitā or pārami) by stories of his past lives in this current age. The text contains 35 such stories, spanning 356 to 371 verses.

The body of the Cariyapitaka is broken into three divisions (vagga), with titles correlated to the first three of the ten Theravada pāramitā:

- Division I (dāna pāramitā): 10 stories for the perfection of offering (dāna)
- Division II (sīla pāramitā): 10 stories for the perfection of conduct (sīla)
- Division III (nekkhamma pāramitā): 15 stories distributed among five other perfections, as follows:
  - renunciation (nekkhamma pāramitā): five stories
  - resolute determination (adhiṭṭhāna pāramitā): one story
  - truth (sacca pāramitā): six stories
  - loving-kindness (mettā pāramitā): two stories
  - equanimity (upekkhā pāramitā): one story

The three remaining Theravada perfections — wisdom (paññā), energy (viriya), patience (khanti) — are mentioned in a closing stanza but no related Cariyapitaka stories have come down to us. Horner suggests that these latter three perfections are "implicit in the collection," referenced in both story titles and contexts.

== Translations ==
- "The collection of the ways of conduct", in Minor Anthologies of the Pali Canon, volume III, 1st edition, tr B. C. Law, 1938
- "Basket of conduct", in Minor Anthologies III (along with "Chronicle of Buddhas (Buddhavamsa)"), 2nd edition, tr I. B. Horner, 1975, Pali Text Society, Bristol
- Tr Bhikkhu Mahinda (Anagarika Mahendra), Cariyāpiṭaka: Book of Basket of Conduct, Bilingual Pali-English First Edition 2022, Dhamma Publishers, Roslindale MA; ISBN 9780999078198 .

== See also ==
- Index of Buddhism-related articles
- Jataka
- Paramita
- Secular Buddhism

== Sources ==
- Barua, B.M. (1945). Ceylon Lectures. Calcutta. Cited in Horner (2000), p. iii, n. 5.
- Hinüber, Oskar von (2000). A Handbook of Pāli Literature. Berlin: Walter de Gruyter. ISBN 3-11-016738-7.
- Horner, I.B. (trans.) (1975; reprinted 2000). The Minor Anthologies of the Pali Canon (Part III): 'Chronicle of Buddhas' (Buddhavamsa) and 'Basket of Conduct' (Cariyapitaka). Oxford: Pali Text Society. ISBN 0-86013-072-X. (All references in this article to "Horner, 2000" use page numbers associated with this volume's Cariyapitaka, not the Buddhavamsa.)
- Rhys Davids, T.W. & William Stede (eds.) (1921-5). The Pali Text Society’s Pali–English Dictionary. Chipstead: Pali Text Society. A general on-line search engine for the PED is available at http://dsal.uchicago.edu/dictionaries/pali/.
