= Pāramitā =

Buddhist qualities for spiritual perfection

Pāramitā (Sanskrit, Pali: पारमिता) or pāramī (Pāli: पारमी) is a Buddhist term often translated as "perfection". It is described in Buddhist commentaries as a noble character quality generally associated with enlightened beings. Pāramī and pāramitā are both terms in Pali but Pali literature makes greater reference to pāramī, while Mahayana texts generally use the Sanskrit pāramitā.

== Etymology ==
Donald S. Lopez Jr. describes the etymology of the term:

The term pāramitā, commonly translated as "perfection", has two etymologies. The first derives it from the word parama, meaning "highest", "most distant", and hence "chief", "primary", "most excellent". Hence, the substantive can be rendered "excellence" or "perfection". This reading is supported by the Madhyāntavibhāga (V.4), where the twelve excellences (parama) are associated with the ten perfections (pāramitā). A more creative yet widely reported etymology divides pāramitā into pāra and mita, with pāra meaning "beyond", "the further bank, shore or boundary," and mita, meaning "that which has arrived", or ita meaning "that which goes". Pāramitā then means "that which has gone beyond", "that which goes beyond" or "transcendent". This reading is reflected in the Tibetan translation pha rol tu phyin pa ("gone to the other side").

== Theravāda Buddhism ==
Theravada teachings on the pāramīs can be found in late canonical books and post-canonical commentaries. Theravada commentator Dhammapala describes them as noble qualities usually associated with bodhisattvas. American scholar-monk Thanissaro Bhikkhu describes them as perfections (paramī) of character necessary to achieve enlightenment as one of the three enlightened beings, a samma sambuddha, a pacceka-buddha, or an arahant.

=== Canonical sources ===
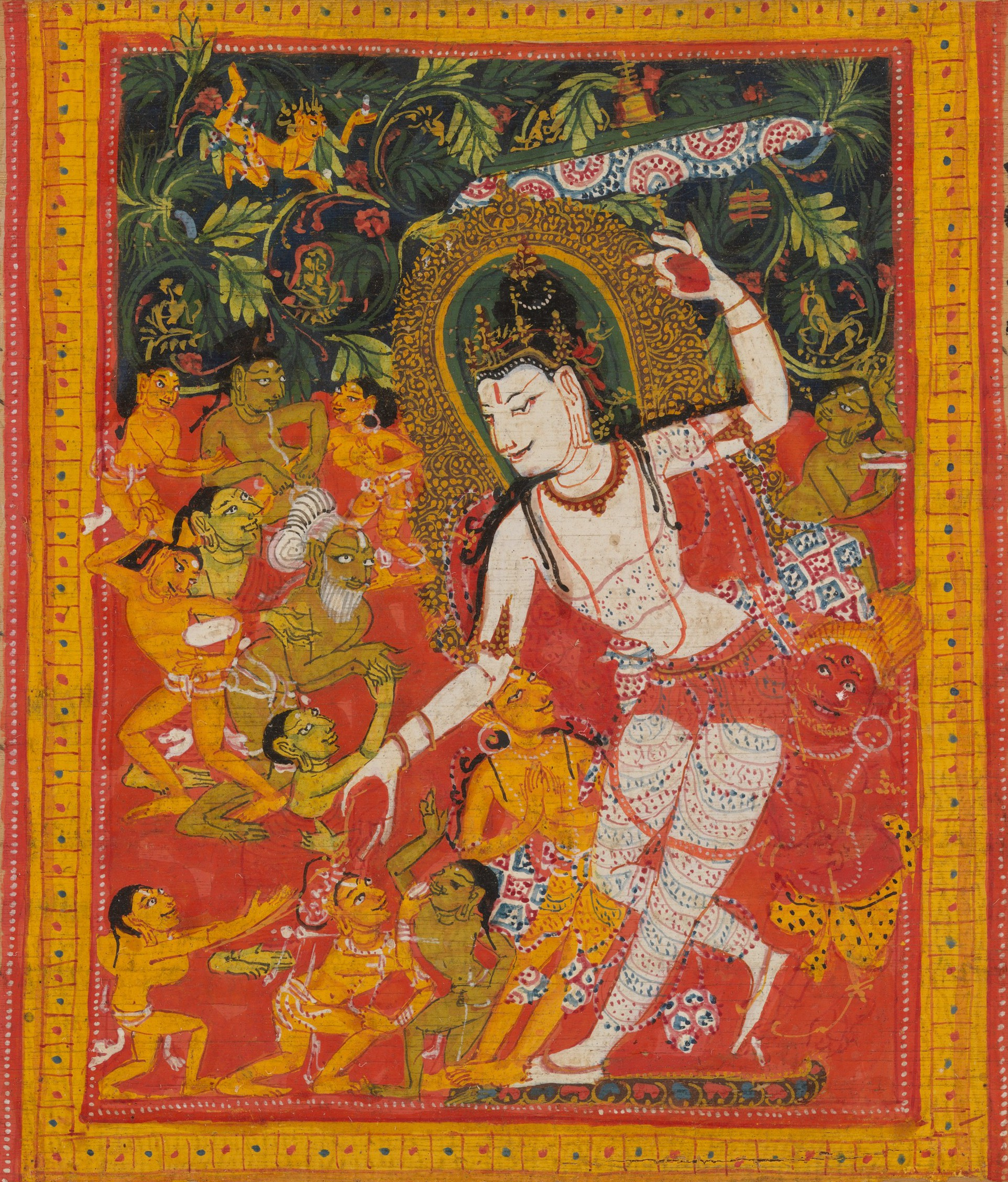
A bodhisattva benefitting sentient beings. Palm-leaf manuscript. Nalanda, Bihar, India

In the Pāli Canon, the Buddhavamsa of the Khuddaka Nikāya lists the ten perfections (dasa pāramiyo) as:

1. Dāna pāramī: generosity, giving of oneself
2. Sīla pāramī: virtue, morality, proper conduct
3. Nekkhamma pāramī: renunciation
4. Paññā pāramī: wisdom, discernment
5. Viriya pāramī: energy, diligence, vigour, effort
6. Khanti pāramī: patience, tolerance, forbearance, acceptance, endurance
7. Sacca pāramī: truthfulness, honesty
8. Adhiṭṭhāna pāramī: determination, resolution
9. Mettā pāramī: goodwill, friendliness, loving-kindness
10. Upekkhā pāramī: equanimity, serenity

Two of these virtues—mettā and upekkhā—are also brahmavihāras, and two – vīrya and upekkhā—are factors of awakening.

=== Historicity ===
The Theravāda teachings on the pāramīs can be found in canonical books (Jataka tales, Apadāna, Buddhavamsa, Cariyāpiṭaka) and post-canonical commentaries written to supplement the Pāli Canon that therefore might not be an original part of the Theravāda teachings. The oldest parts of the Sutta Piṭaka (for example, Majjhima Nikāya, Digha Nikāya, Saṃyutta Nikāya and the Aṅguttara Nikāya) do not mention the pāramīs as a category (though they are all mentioned individually).

Some scholars refer to the pāramīs as a semi-Mahāyāna teaching added to the scriptures at a later time in order to appeal to the interests and needs of the lay community and to popularize their religion. However, these views rely on the early scholarly presumption of Mahāyāna originating with religious devotion and appeal to laity. More recently, scholars have started to open up early Mahāyāna literature, which is very ascetic and expounds the ideal of the monk's life in the forest. Therefore, the practice of the pāramitās in Mahāyāna Buddhism may have been close to the ideals of the ascetic tradition of the śramaṇa.

The cultivation of pāramīs is closely linked with Buddhist kingship, and the Burmese and Thai sociological concepts of hpone and barami respectively.

=== Traditional practice ===
Bhikkhu Bodhi maintains that in the earliest Buddhist texts (which he identifies as the first four nikāyas), those seeking the extinction of suffering (nibbana) pursued the noble eightfold path. As time went on, a backstory was provided for the multi-life development of the Buddha; as a result, the ten perfections were identified as part of the path for the bodhisattva (Pāli: bodhisatta). Over subsequent centuries, the pāramīs were seen as being significant for aspirants to both Buddhahood and arahantship. Bhikkhu Bodhi summarizes:

in established Theravāda tradition the pāramīs are not regarded as a discipline peculiar to candidates for Buddhahood alone but as practices which must be fulfilled by all aspirants to enlightenment and deliverance, whether as Buddhas, paccekabuddhas, or disciples. What distinguishes the supreme bodhisattva from aspirants in the other two vehicles is the degree to which the pāramīs must be cultivated and the length of time they must be pursued. But the qualities themselves are universal requisites for deliverance, which all must fulfill to at least a minimal degree to merit the fruits of the liberating path.

== Sarvāstivāda ==
The Sarvāstivāda Vaibhāṣika school's main commentary, the Mahāvibhāṣā, teaches the bodhisattva path based on a system of four pāramitās:

- generosity (dāna),
- discipline (śīla),
- energy (vīrya),
- wisdom (prajñā),

The Mahāvibhāṣā also mentions the system of six pāramitās, arguing that patience (Kṣānti) is classified as a kind of discipline and that meditation (Dhyāna) is to be seen as a mode of wisdom (prajñā).

== Mahāyāna Buddhism ==
Mahāyāna texts refer to the pāramitās as "bases of training" used for self-cultivation on the bodhisattva path to Buddhahood.

=== Six perfections ===
The Prajñapāramitā sūtras and a large number of other Mahāyāna texts list six perfections: giving, ethical discipline, patience, vigorous effort, meditation, wisdom (prajñā).

The list of six paramitas is also mentioned by the Theravāda commentator Dhammapala, who describes it as a categorisation of the same ten perfections of Theravada Buddhism. According to Dhammapala, Sacca is classified as both Śīla and Prajñā, Mettā and Upekkhā are classified as Dhyāna, and Adhiṭṭhāna falls under all six. Bhikkhu Bodhi states that the correlations between the two sets shows there was a shared core before the Theravada and Mahayana schools split.

==== Dānapāramitā ====
Dāna-pāramitā (Chinese: 布施波羅蜜, pinyin: bushi boluomi; Tibetan Wylie: byin pa’i pha rol tu phyin pa) refers to a bodhisattva's practice of generosity, giving, charity. There are three main types of giving: the "gift of material goods" (āmisa-dāna), the "gift of fearlessness" (abhaya-dāna), and the "gift of the Dharma" (dharma-dāna).

The perfection of giving is fully developed on the first of the ten bodhisattva stages (bhūmi). At this stage, the bodhisattva, through insight into emptiness, is inspired to perfect the practice of giving. This involves offering even the most cherished possessions—such as wealth, family, and even the bodhisattva’s own body (dehadāna)—without attachment.

A key element of the perfection of giving which distinguishes it from regular charity is how the bodhisattva, through their the understanding of emptiness, realizes that there is no inherent existence in the donor, the recipient, or the gift itself. With this realization, ordinary acts of giving are transformed into perfected acts of giving. This perfection leads to an awareness of universal suchness.

==== Śīlapāramitā ====
Śīla-pāramitā (C. 持戒波羅蜜, chi jie boluomi; T. tshul khrims kyi pha rol tu phyin pa) is the perfection of virtue, moral conduct, or ethical discipline. In Mahāyāna Buddhism, the perfection of ethical discipline is fulfilled by observing the bodhisattva precepts, which is divided into the "three sets of pure precepts" (trividhāni śīlāni; C. 三聚净戒, sanju jingjie). These are:

1. The saṃvaraśīla (restraining precepts), which pertain to the rules of discipline (prātimokṣa) and proper conduct that prevent unwholesome actions. For laypersons this mainly refers to the five precepts. For monks, it includes the entire Vinaya.
2. The accumulation of wholesome qualities (kuśaladharmasaṃgrāhaka), which fosters all virtuous behaviors leading to the development of the Buddha-dharma. This includes things like making offerings and dedication of merit.
3. Acting for the benefit of sentient beings (sattvārthakriyā), which involves providing assistance and compassion to others. It includes taking care of the sick, protecting people from danger, teaching people the Dharma, giving to the poor, and so on.

The first category corresponds to foundational precepts emphasized in the "Hīnayāna" tradition, while the latter two represent the Mahāyāna perspective on moral conduct. Together, the three sets of precepts form a comprehensive framework that integrates both Hīnayāna and Mahāyāna views on morality into a unified system.

Śīla-pāramitā is the main focus of cultivation on the second bodhisattva stage. At this stage, the bodhisattva overcomes the obstruction of deluded conduct (mithyāpratipattyāvaraṇa; C. 邪行障, xiexing zhang).

==== Kṣāntipāramitā ====
Kṣānti-pāramitā (Ch: 忍辱波羅蜜 renru boluomi; T. bzod pa’i pha rol tu) is the bodhisattva's perfection of patience, a virtue which also has connotations of tolerance, forbearance, acceptance, and endurance. The term kṣānti holds multiple meanings. It often refers to the patience and endurance demonstrated by a bodhisattva in various aspects of their spiritual journey and includes the ability to endure abuse and hardship inflicted by sentient beings without wavering in compassion or resolve. It also means that a bodhisattva maintains a commitment to persevere through the difficulties encountered on the path to buddhahood, maintaining the dedication to liberate all beings from saṃsāra. Furthermore, it also refers to the capacity to accept and be receptive to the profound truths of reality, such as impermanence, suffering, emptiness, and not-self, without being overwhelmed or fearful for them.

This latter sense is particularly important in Mahāyāna, which culminates in the attainment of "receptivity to the non-production of dharmas" (anutpattikadharmakṣānti). This attainment refers to a bodhisattva's unwavering receptive realization that all phenomena (dharmas) are intrinsically "unproduced" (anutpāda) and "empty" (śūnyatā), including themselves, Buddhahood and the Dharma itself. The acceptance and realization of this ultimate truth is crucial for attaining the stage of non-retrogression (avaivartika) in which a bodhisattva cannot fall back to a lesser level, which is often identified with the first or eighth bhūmi on the bodhisattva path.

==== Vīryapāramitā ====
Vīrya-pāramitā (C. 精進波羅蜜, jingjin boluomiduo; T. brtson ’grus kyi pha rol tu phyin pa) is the perfection of energy, diligence, vigour, or effort. Vīrya-pāramitā represents the tireless and unwavering energy and effort necessary to overcome obstacles, cultivate virtue, and realise wisdom on the bodhisattva path. This perfection is fully realized during the fourth stage of the bodhisattva path. At this stage, the radiant intensity of the thirty-seven factors of enlightenment (bodhipākṣikadharma) becomes so powerful that it burns away all defilements and obstructions. This purification grants the bodhisattva boundless energy to pursue enlightenment and the liberation of all beings.

==== Dhyānapāramitā ====
Dhyāna-pāramitā (C. 禪定波羅蜜, jinglü boluomiduo; T. bsam gtan gyi pha rol tu phyin pa) is the perfection of meditation or contemplative absorption and is closely associated with the bodhisattva's mastery of numerous samādhis. The perfection of dhyana in Mahayana Buddhism includes the classic early Buddhist meditative states called the four dhyānas, which gradually take a meditator to a place beyond all thought.

However, according to the Dazhidulun, a bodhisattva's meditations are also significantly different than the non-Mahayana dhyānas. While in Theravada, the dhyānas are meant to go beyond all thought into a perfectly peaceful unmoving state of mind, the Dazhidulun mentions that regarding the practice of the four meditations or dhyānas "the bodhisattva practicing dhyānapāramitā enters the successive dhyāna stages with thoughts of the realm of desire." This is because a bodhisattva, while having no coarse thinking (vitarka) or subtle examination (vicara), they are still focused on all sentient beings in all realms and seek to guide them to nirvana. This is due to the Mahayana emphasis on compassion for all beings, which rejects the idea that we must retreat to state of mind which is completely detached from all beings.

As such, Mahayana texts are careful to warn bodhisattvas not to practice dhyāna in the same manner as Hinayanists, that is to say, to practice them in a self-centered manner that seeks only an individual escape from samsara. As such, the Aṣṭādaśasāhasrikāprajñāpāramitā states that a bodhisattva must master the eight dhyānas without seeking their karmic fruit (i.e. rebirth outside the realm of desire). This is done through developing bodhicitta, as the Aṣṭādaśasāhasrikāprajñāpāramitā states, the bodhisattva meditates by "not clinging to the level of sravakas and pratyekabuddhas, and [practices meditation thinking], 'Having stood in the perfection of dhyāna, I must now liberate all beings from the cycle of rebirths.'"

==== Prajñāpāramitā ====
Prajñāpāramitā (C. 般若波羅蜜, bore boluomiduo; T. shes rab kyi pha rol tu phyin pa), the perfection of wisdom, is the most important and foundational of all the pāramitās and the source of them all. This term carries multiple meanings, but generally speaking, Prajñāpāramitā refers to a transcendent kind of wisdom surpassing ordinary understanding, particularly the wisdom required for achieving buddhahood. It is often defined as the realization of emptiness (śūnyatā) and suchness (Tathātā), and the insight that agent, object, and action lack a permanent essence or svabhava. When linked to the ten bodhisattva stages (bhūmi), the perfection of wisdom corresponds to the sixth stage.

=== Ten perfections ===
In the Ten Stages Sutra, four more pāramitās are listed, bringing the total count to ten perfection. The extra four are: Upāya-pāramitā (perfection of skillful means), Praṇidhāna-pāramitā (perfection of aspiration or vows), Bala-pāramitā (perfection of power) and Jñāna pāramitā (perfection of knowledge). The Mahāratnakūṭa Sūtra (Sutra of the Heap of Jewels) also includes these additional four pāramitās, with the order of numbers 8 and 9 switched.

==== Upāyapāramitā ====
The perfection of skillful means (upāya-kauśalya) is the skill of a Buddha or an advanced bodhisattva which allows them to perfectly tailor their teachings and actions to align with the inclinations and capacities of his audience. Because buddhas and bodhisattvas have profound understanding, they can provide teachings that are most suitable for each individual, akin to a physician prescribing specific treatments for particular ailments. Moreover, skillful means can serve to explain why certain actions, which might seem unethical to beings of limited spiritual insight, become virtuous when undertaken by a bodhisattva who acts with the ultimate welfare of others in mind.

==== Praṇidhānapāramitā ====
Praṇidhānapāramitā (C. 願波羅 yuan boluomi; T. smon lam gyi pha rol tu phyin pa) is the perfection of the bodhisattva's vow or "aspiration". This refers to how bodhisattvas make solemn declarations of their intent to achieve buddhahood for the sake of all sentient beings. These vows can take the form of an oath, where one commits to achieving a goal, or a prayer, where one dedicates merit toward its realization. The term also appears in the context of pūrvapraṇidhāna, meaning "prior vow." This refers to a pledge made in the past, either already fulfilled in the present or destined for fulfillment in the future, typically in relation to the aspiration for buddhahood.

==== Balapāramitā ====
Balapāramitā (C. 力波羅蜜 li bo-luomi; T. stobs kyi pha rol tu phyin pa) is the “perfection of power” or “strength”. This refers to the power of a bodhisattva which allows him to master elements of the teaching, such as the four analytical knowledges or four discriminations (pratisaṃvid).

==== Jñānapāramitā ====
Jñāna-pāramitā (C. 智 zhi; T. ye shes) is the perfection of "gnosis," or "knowledge", which denotes a distinct understanding of an object’s nature. While prajñāpāramitā signifies perfected spiritual insight into ultimate reality, jñāna refers to more general forms of knowledge specific to the path of the bodhisattva. There are various schemas of these types of knowledge. One text, the Abhisamayālaṅkāra, divides knowledge into three main types: knowledge of all aspects (sarvākārajñatā, only Buddhas have this), knowledge of paths (mārgākārajñatā, which is accessible to bodhisattvas) and all-knowledge (sarvajñatā, accessible even to sravakas).

=== Tibetan Buddhism ===
According to the perspective of Tibetan Buddhism, the practice of accumulating paramitas is generally considered very important. In most contexts, they are seen as a fundamental basis for practice of the higher teachings, such as Vajrayana. The Dalai Lama has said:

To attain enlightenment, we need better rebirths; and the six perfections – in particular, far-reaching ethical self-discipline – enable us to attain better rebirths. We won’t be able to help others materially if we aren’t wealthy, and so we need to cultivate generosity. We need virtuous friends, and so we must reject anger and practice patience. In order to accomplish anything, we need perseverance. To gain friends, we must control our disturbing emotions, and so we must practice mental constancy (concentration). And finally, to really be effective in helping others, we need the discriminating awareness (wisdom) of knowing what is beneficial and what is of harm. Therefore, we need to cultivate all six far-reaching attitudes.

Similarly, concerning the six paramitas, or "the six far-reaching attitudes," and how they relate to the practice of the three vehicles of Tibetan Buddhism, the Dalai Lama has said:

The Hinayana path is the preliminary path, the Mahayana sutra one is the main path, and tantra is something to train in only as a branch. The four tenet systems are like stairs. The higher systems highlight contradictions in the lower ones, but by knowing the lower, we can appreciate the profundity of the higher. The higher systems are vast and profound since they do not contradict logic. If we are aware of the areas in which we can make mistakes, it helps us to stay on the right path and have confidence in it. Thus, the study of the tenet systems gives stability to our view. Then, on the basis of the six far-reaching attitudes and bodhichitta, we will be able to fulfill our own aims and those of others.

Traleg Kyabgon Rinpoche renders "pāramitā" into English as "transcendent action" and then frames and qualifies it:

When we say that paramita means "transcendent action," we mean it in the sense that actions or attitude are performed in a non-egocentric manner. "Transcendental" does not refer to some external reality, but rather to the way in which we conduct our lives and perceive the world – either in an egocentric or a non-egocentric way. The six paramitas are concerned with the effort to step out of the egocentric mentality.

The initial four perfections involve skillful means practice, while the last two pertain to wisdom practice. Together, they encompass all the necessary methods and skills to dispel delusion and meet the needs of others, and to rise from states of contentment to even greater happiness.

== See also ==
- Anupubbikathā – Method of teaching used by the Buddha
- Bodhipakkhiyādhammā – Spiritual qualities conducive to Buddhist cultivation
- Buddhist paths to liberation – Summaries of the Buddhist path to liberation
- Gradual training – Form of Buddhist training
- Pañca-Parameṣṭhi – Fivefold hierarchy of religious authorities in Jainism
- Threefold Training – Buddhist practices for higher virtue, mind, and wisdom

== Sources ==
- Apte, Vaman Shivaram (1957–59). Revised and enlarged edition of Prin. V. S. Apte's The Practical Sanskrit-English Dictionary. Poona: Prasad Prakashan.
- Bodhi, Bhikkhu (1978). The All-Embracing Net of Views. Kandy: Buddhist Publication Society.
- Bodhi, Bhikkhu (ed.) (1978, 2005). A Treatise on the Paramis: From the Commentary to the Cariyapitaka A Treatise on the Paramis]: From the Commentary to the Cariyapitaka by Acariya Dhammapala (The Wheel, No. 409/411). Kandy: Buddhist Publication Society.
- Horner, I.B. (trans.) (1975; reprinted 2000). The Minor Anthologies of the Pali Canon (Part III): 'Chronicle of Buddhas' (Buddhavamsa) and 'Basket of Conduct' (Cariyapitaka). Oxford: Pali Text Society. ISBN 0-86013-072-X.
- Lopez, Donald S. Jr. (1988). The Heart Sutra Explained: Indian and Tibetan Commentaries. SUNY Press. ISBN 978-0-88706-589-7.
- Rhys Davids, T.W. & William Stede (eds.) (1921-5). The Pali Text Society’s Pali–English Dictionary. Chipstead: Pali Text Society.
