= Adhiṭṭhāna =

Resolute determination, in Buddhism

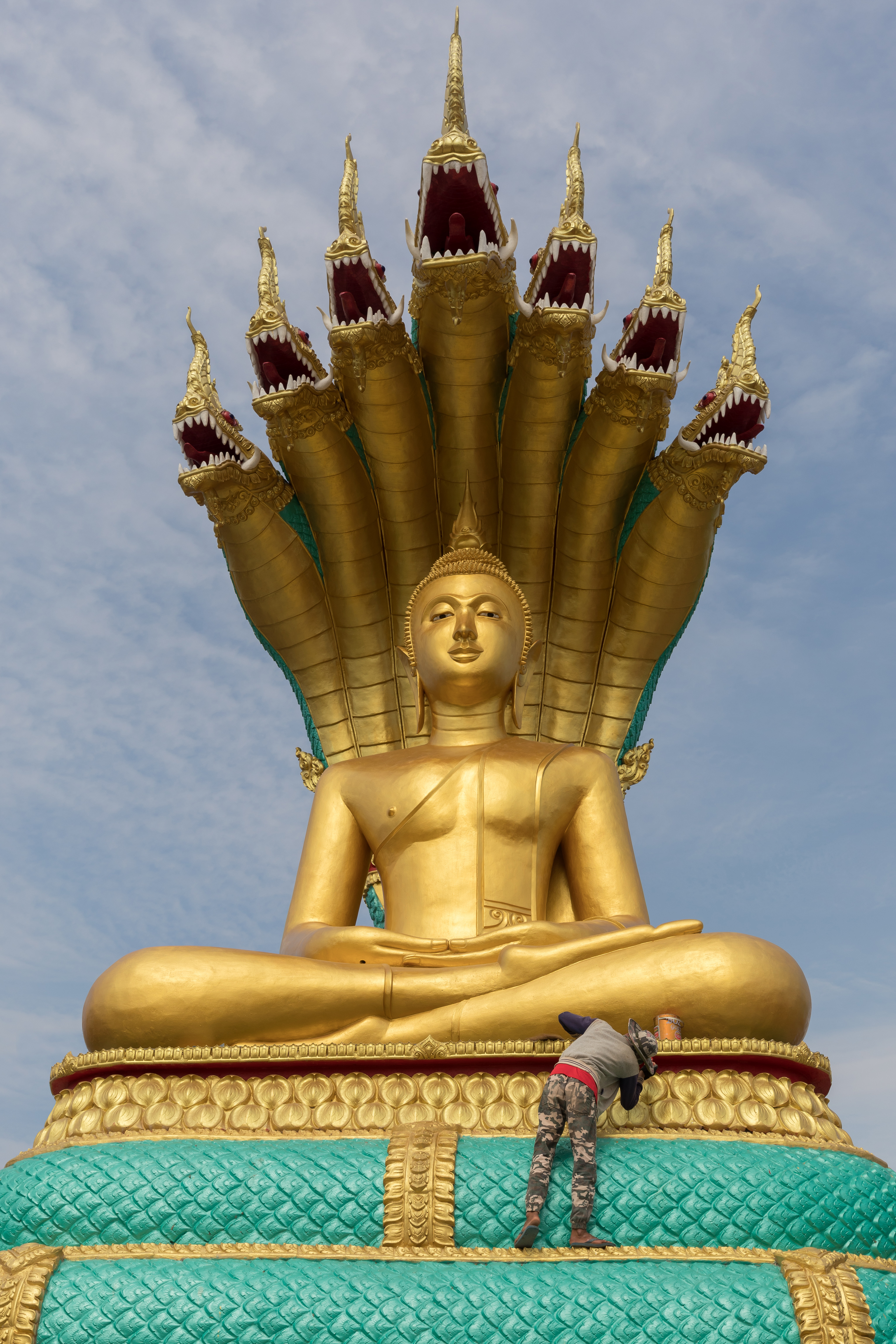
Buddha

Adhiṭṭhāna (Pali: 𑀅𑀥𑀺𑀝𑁆𑀞𑀸𑀦 from adhi, meaning "foundational" or "beginning" plus sthā meaning "standing"; Sanskrit: 𑀅𑀥𑀺𑀱𑁆𑀞𑀸𑀦, romanized: adhiṣṭhāna) has been translated as "decision," "resolution," "self-determination," "will", "strong determination" and "resolute determination." In the late canonical literature of Theravāda Buddhism, adhiṭṭhāna is one of the ten "perfections" (dasa pāramiyo), exemplified by the bodhisatta's resolve to become fully awakened.

== Pāli Canon texts ==
While adhiṭṭhāna appears sporadically in the early Pāli Canon, various late-canonical and post-canonical accounts of the Gautama Buddha's past lives contextualize adhiṭṭhāna within the Theravādin ten perfections.

=== Dīgha Nikāya analysis ===
In the Pāli Canon, in the Dīgha Nikāya discourse entitled, "Chanting Together" (DN 33), Sāriputta states that the Buddha identified the following:

Four kinds of resolve (adhiṭṭhānī): [to gain] (a) wisdom, (b) truth (sacca), (c) relinquishment (cāga), (d) tranquility (upasama).

=== Bodhisatta Sumedho ===
In the late-canonical Buddhavaṃsa, the bodhisatta Sumedha declares (represented in English and Pāli):

And as a mountain, a rock, stable and firmly based,
does not tremble in rough winds but remains in precisely its own place,
so you too must be constantly stable in resolute determination;
going on to the perfection of Resolute Determination, you will attain Self-Awakening.

Yathā'pi pabbato selo acalo suppatiṭṭhito
Na kampati bhusavātehi sakaṭṭhāne'va tiṭṭhati.
Tathe'ca tvampi adhiṭṭhāne sabbadā acalo bhava
Adhiṭṭhānapāramiṃ gantvā sambodhiṃ pāpuṇissasi.

=== Temiya the Wise ===
In the late-canonical Cariyāpiṭaka, there is one account explicitly exemplifying adhiṭṭhāna, that of "Temiya the Wise" (Cp III.6, Temiya paṇḍita cariyaṃ). In this account, at an early age Temiya, sole heir to a throne, recalls a past life in purgatory (niraya) and thus asks for release (kadāhaṃ imaṃ muñcissaṃ). In response, a compassionate devatā advises Temiya to act unintelligent and foolish and to allow himself to be an object of people's scorn. Understanding the devatā's virtuous intent, Temiya agrees to this and acts as if mute, deaf, and crippled. Seeing these behaviors but finding no physiological basis for them, priests, generals and countrymen decry Temiya as "inauspicious" and plan to have Temiya cast out. When Temiya is sixteen years old, he is ceremonially anointed and then buried in a pit. The account concludes:

... I did not break that resolute determination which was for the sake of Awakening itself. Mother and father were not disagreeable to me and nor was self disagreeable to me. Omniscience [sabbaññuta] was dear to me, therefore I resolutely determined on that itself. Resolutely determining on those factors I lived for sixteen years. There was no one equal to me in resolute determination — this was my perfection of Resolute Determination.

== See also ==
- Parami (perfection)
  - Pañña (wisdom)
  - Sacca (truth)
  - Dāna (generosity)
  - Passaddhi (tranquillity)
  - Nekkhamma (renunciation)
  - Upekkhā (equanimity)
  - Khanti (patience)
  - Metta (loving-kindness)
  - Vīrya (diligence)

== Sources ==
- The Minor Anthologies of the Pali Canon (Part III): 'Chronicle of Buddhas' (Buddhavamsa) and 'Basket of Conduct' (Cariyapitaka). Translated by Horner, I.B. Oxford: Pali Text Society. 2000 [1975]. ISBN 0-86013-072-X.
- Rhys Davids, T.W.; Stede, William, eds. (1921–25). The Pali Text Society's Pali–English Dictionary. Chipstead: Pali Text Society. A general on-line search engine for the PED is available at http://dsal.uchicago.edu/dictionaries/pali/.
- The Long Discourses of the Buddha: A Translation of the Dīgha Nikāya. Translated by Walshe, Maurice. Boston: Wisdom Publications. 1995 [1987]. ISBN 0-86171-103-3.
