= Sacca (Buddhism) =

Buddhist term meaning "real" or "true"

Sacca (Sanskrit: सत्य) is a Pali word meaning "real" or "true". In early Buddhist literature, sacca is often found in the context of the "Four Noble Truths", a crystallization of Buddhist wisdom. In addition, sacca is one of the ten pāramīs or "most high" a bodhisatta must develop in order to become a Buddha.

== The profoundest truth of reality ==
In the Pali Canon, sacca is frequently found in the term ariya-sacca, meaning "noble truth" or "truth of the noble ones". More specifically, the term ariya-sacca refers to the Buddha's "Four Noble Truths," elucidated in his first discourse as follows (where sacca is translated as "reality"):

Now this, bhikkhus, is the Truth about pain: birth is painful, aging is painful, illness is painful, death is painful; sorrow, lamentation, physical pain, unhappiness and distress are painful; union with what is disliked is painful; separation from what is liked is painful; not to get what one wants is painful; in brief, the five bundles of grasping-fuel are painful.

Now this, bhikkhus, is the Truth about that which causes pain: It is this craving which leads to renewed existence, accompanied by delight and attachment, seeking delight now here now there; that is, craving for sense-pleasures, craving for existence, craving for extermination (of what is not liked).

Now this, bhikkhus, is the Truth about that which can put an end to pain. It is the remainderless fading away and cessation of that same craving, the giving up and relinquishing of it, freedom from it, non-reliance on it.

Now this, bhikkhus, is the Truth about that which is the way leading to the cessation of pain. It is this Noble Eight-factored Path, that is to say, right view, right resolve, right speech, right action, right livelihood, right effort, right mindfulness, right mental unification.

In the Pali literature, these Four Noble Truths are often identified as the most common idea associated with the Noble Eightfold Path's factor of "right view" or "right understanding". And in the Buddhist causal notion of Dependent Origination, ignorance of these Four Noble Truths is often identified as the starting point for "the whole mass of suffering" (kevalassa dukkhakkhandha).

== Truth as an ethical practice ==
In terms of the daily practice of Buddhist laity, a lay devotee daily recites the Five Precepts which include:

I undertake the precept to refrain from incorrect speech.

"Incorrect speech", at its most basic, reflects speaking truthfully. Regarding this, contemporary Theravada monk Bhikkhu Bodhi has written:

It is said that in the course of his long training for enlightenment over many lives, a bodhisatta can break all the moral precepts except the pledge to speak the truth. The reason for this is very profound, and reveals that the commitment to truth has a significance transcending the domain of ethics and even mental purification, taking us to the domains of knowledge and being. Truthful speech provides, in the sphere of interpersonal communication, a parallel to wisdom in the sphere of private understanding. The two are respectively the outward and inward modalities of the same commitment to what is real. Wisdom consists in the realization of truth, and truth (sacca) is not just a verbal proposition but the nature of things as they are. To realize truth our whole being has to be brought into accord with actuality, with things as they are, which requires that in communications with others we respect things as they are by speaking the truth. Truthful speech establishes a correspondence between our own inner being and the real nature of phenomena, allowing wisdom to rise up and fathom their real nature. Thus, much more than an ethical principle, devotion to truthful speech is a matter of taking our stand on reality rather than illusion, on the truth grasped by wisdom rather than the fantasies woven by desire.

== See also ==
- Four Noble Truths
- Noble Eightfold Path
- Śīla
- Adhiṭṭhāna (resolute determination)
- Pañña (wisdom)
- Dāna (generosity)
- Passaddhi (tranquillity)
- Nekkhamma (renunciation)
- Upekkhā (equanimity)
- Khanti (patience)
- Metta (loving-kindness)
- Vīrya (diligence)
- Bodhipakkhiya dhamma (Qualities conducive to Enlightenment)
- Two truths
- Sacca-kiriya

== Sources ==
- Bodhi, Bhikkhu (1984, 1999). The Noble Eightfold Path: The Way to the End of Suffering (The Wheel, No. 308/311). Kandy: Buddhist Publication Society. Retrieved 2006-04-30 from "Access to Insight" at http://www.accesstoinsight.org/lib/authors/bodhi/waytoend.html.
- Bullitt, John T. (2005). The Five Precepts (pañca-sila). Retrieved 2007-11-12 from "Access to Insight" at http://www.accesstoinsight.org/ptf/dhamma/sila/pancasila.html.
- Harvey, Peter (trans.) (2007). Dhammacakkappavattana Sutta: The Discourse on the Setting in Motion of the Wheel (of Vision) of the Basic Pattern: the Four Realities of the Noble One(s) (SN 56.11). Retrieved 2007-11-12 from "Access to Insight" at http://www.accesstoinsight.org/tipitaka/sn/sn56/sn56.011.harv.html.
- Rhys Davids, T.W. & William Stede (eds.) (1921–25). The Pali Text Society's Pali–English Dictionary. Chipstead: Pali Text Society. A general on-line search engine for the PED is available at http://dsal.uchicago.edu/dictionaries/pali/.
