= Prajñā (Buddhism) =

Buddhist term often translated as "wisdom" or "intelligence"

Prajñā (प्रज्ञा) or paññā (𑀧𑀜𑁆𑀜𑀸) is a Hindu-Buddhist term often translated as "wisdom", "transcendental wisdom", "insight", "intelligence", or "understanding". It is described in Buddhist texts as the understanding of the true nature of phenomena. In the context of Buddhist meditation, it is the ability to understand the three characteristics of all things: anicca ("impermanence"), dukkha ("dissatisfaction" or "suffering"), and anattā ("non-self" or "egolessness"). Mahāyāna texts describe it as the understanding of śūnyatā ("emptiness"). It is part of the Threefold Training in Buddhism, and is one of the ten pāramīs of Theravāda Buddhism and one of the six Mahāyāna pāramitās.

== Etymology ==
Prajñā is often translated as "wisdom", some scholars such as Damien Keown claimed that it is closer in meaning to "insight", "non-discriminating knowledge" or "intuitive apprehension", while some others argue that it should be translated to "analytical appreciative understanding", however, Edward Conze believed that "wisdom" is still the most proper translation.

The component parts of the word are:

Pra (प्र)
an intensifier which can be translated as "higher", "greater", "supreme" or "premium", or "being born or springing up", referring to a spontaneous type of knowing
jñā (ज्ञा)
can be translated as "consciousness", "knowledge", or "understanding"

Hence the word Prajñā composed of these two parts can be translated as "Supreme Understanding" or "Transcendental Wisdom".

Pali scholars T. W. Rhys Davids and William Stede define paññā (prajñā) as "intelligence, comprising all the higher faculties of cognition" and "intellect as conversant with general truths".

British Buddhist monk and Pāli scholar Ñāṇamoli Bhikkhu translates prajñā (paññā), as "understanding", specifically the "state of understanding". Ñāṇamoli Bhikkhu notes that Pāli makes a distinction between the "state of understanding" (paññā) and the "act of understanding" (pajānana) in a way different from how English does.

== Role in Buddhist traditions ==
Paññā is the fourth virtue of ten pāramīs found in late canonic (Khuddaka Nikāya) and Theravādan commentary, and the sixth of the six Mahāyāna pāramitās. It is the third level of the Threefold Training in Buddhism consisting of sīla, samādhi, and paññā.

=== Theravada Buddhism ===
Theravada Buddhist commentator Acariya Dhammapala describes paññā as the comprehension of the characteristics of things or phenomena with skillful means. Dhammapala states that paññā has the attribute of penetrating the true nature of phenomena.

Abhidharma commentaries relate that there are three types of paññā:

1. learned paññā (suta-maya-paññā)
  knowledge or wisdom that is acquired from books or listening to others.
2. reflective paññā (cinta-maya-paññā)
  knowledge or wisdom that is acquired from thought or logic and reasoning.
3. paññā from spiritual development (bhāvanā-maya-paññā)
  knowledge or wisdom that is acquired from direct spiritual experience. Fifth-century Theravada commentator Buddhaghosa states that this category of knowledge is produced from higher meditative absorptions.

Thai Buddhist monk and meditation-master Ajahn Lee classifies the first two types of paññā as dhamma on the theory-level and the last as dhamma on the practice-level. Ajahn Lee states that this results in two levels of paññā: mundane paññā which is the comprehension of worldly and dhamma subjects, and transcendent paññā which is an awareness of the supramundane that is realized by enlightened beings.

Abhidharma commentaries describe seven ways to gain paññā:

1. asking a wise person
2. keeping things clean
3. balancing the five faculties (faith, energy, mindfulness, concentration, and wisdom)
4. avoiding foolish people
5. associating with wise people
6. reflecting on and analyzing the dhamma
7. having the mind inclined towards developing wisdom

==== Vipassanā Paññā ====
Buddhaghosa states in his commentary and meditation treatise, the Visuddhimagga, that there are many different types and aspects of paññā but does not define them all. Buddhaghosa specifies paññā in relation to Buddhist meditation as being specifically vipassanā-paññā ("insight wisdom"), meaning insight knowledge endowed with virtue.

Buddhaghosa defines vipassanā-paññā as “knowing in a particular mode separate from the modes of perceiving (sañjānana) and cognizing (vijjānana)”. Buddhaghosa makes the analogy of how a child, villager, and money-changer sees money to explain his definition. The child can perceive (sañjānana) coins through the senses but does not know the value, the villager knows the value of the coins and is conscious (vijjānana) of the coins' characteristics as a medium of exchange, and the money-changer has an understanding (paññā) of the coins that is even deeper than the surface understanding the villager has because the money-changer can identify which coins are real or fake, which village created them, etc.

Paññā in the context of Buddhist meditation is described as the ability to understand the three characteristics of all things, namely impermanence, suffering, and non-self. Buddhaghoṣa states that the function of paññā is "to abolish the darkness of delusion" in order to understand the "individual essence of states".

=== Mahāyāna Buddhism ===
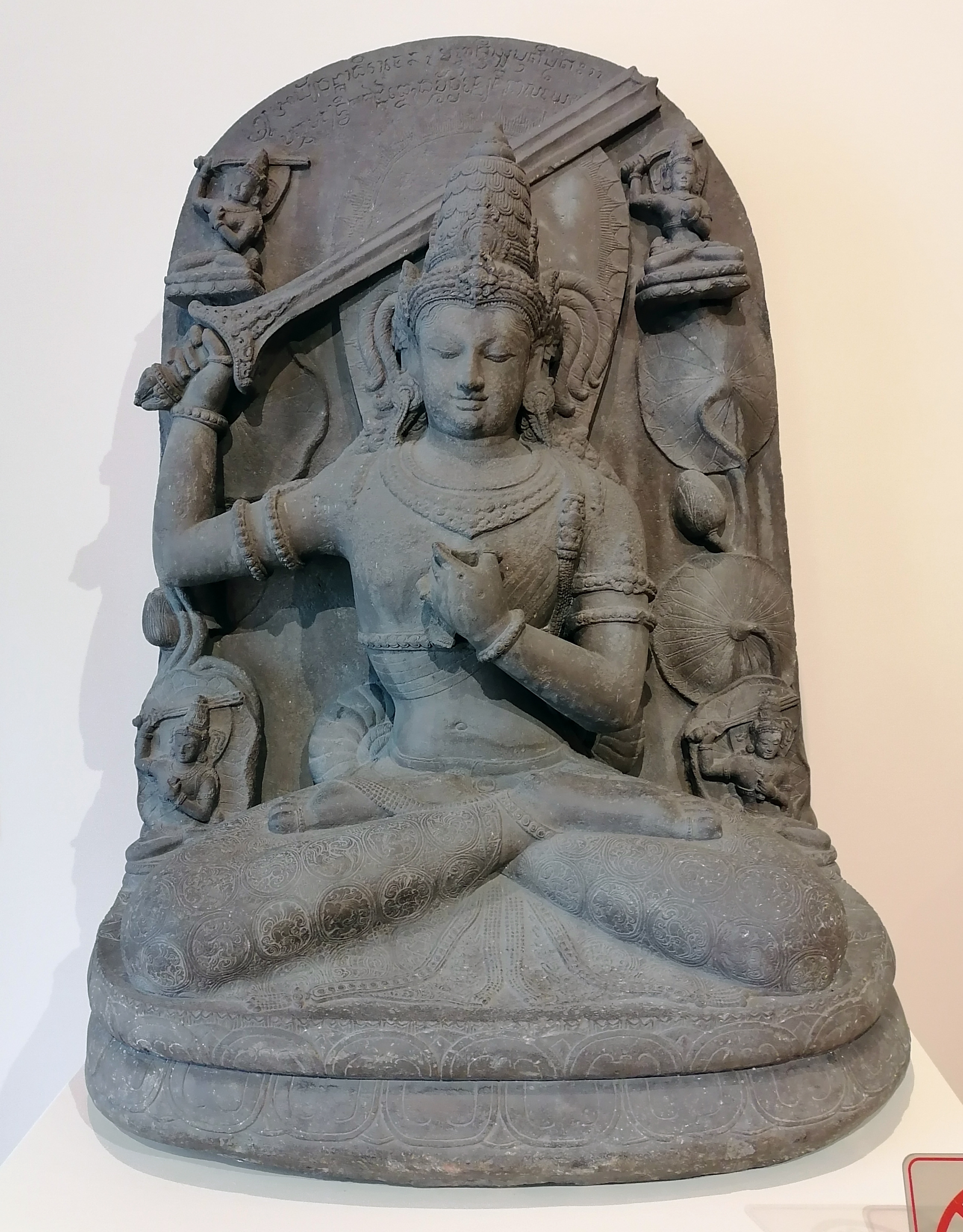
Mañjuśrī, the bodhisattva of wisdom, holding a sword (a symbol of prajñā's ability to cut through delusions) from Candi Jago, 14th century Java, Indonesia

In Mahayana Buddhism and in the northern Abhidharma schools, prajñā (Tibetan: shes rab; Chinese: 般若/慧, bōrě/huì; Japanese: hannya) or understanding, is one of the five mental factors (caitta) present in all wholesome (kuśala) mental states. Prajñā involves the precise and analytical discernment of dharmas (phenomena) as expounded in Buddhist teachings. This wisdom allows practitioners to distinguish between virtues and flaws, thereby dispelling doubt and fostering clarity.

Prajñā is also one of the five spiritual faculties (pañcendriya) and powers (pañcabala). It works alongside faith (śraddhā) to overcome skepticism (vicikitsā) and cultivates balanced spiritual development. As one of the three primary trainings (triśikṣā), along with morality (śīla) and concentration (samādhi), prajñā transcends mere mental stability achieved through meditation. It entails a deep comprehension of reality, often compared to a sword that cuts through ignorance.

According to Mahayana sources like the Yogācārabhūmi-śāstra, to cultivate prajñā one must also cultivate ethics (sīla), since a mind free of guilt is one which is psychologically fertile for the arising of wisdom.

Three distinct forms of prajñā (Sanskrit: trividhā prajñā; Chinese: 三慧) are recognized in the Indian Yogācārabhūmi-Śāstra, reflecting different ways a Buddhist can attain an understanding of reality or three capabilities of knowledge. These three are:

1. Śrutamayī-prajñā (Wisdom from Hearing / Learning; Ch: 聞慧): This foundational form of wisdom arises through listening to teachings, reading texts, or studying the Dharma. It lays the groundwork for mindfulness and concentration, which are vital for achieving meditative calm (śamatha).
2. Cintāmayī-prajñā (Wisdom from Reflection; Ch: 思慧): Building on learning, this type of wisdom emerges from thoughtful contemplation and analysis of teachings. Practitioners deepen their intellectual grasp of the Dharma, applying insights to understand the nature of existence. While it involves focused attention, it does not yet reach the full tranquility of advanced meditation.
3. Bhāvanāmayī-prajñā (Wisdom from Cultivation; Ch: 修慧): The culmination of wisdom, this form is generated through meditative practice and experiential realization. It represents the integration of śamatha (calm abiding) and vipaśyanā (insight), allowing practitioners to perceive reality directly and profoundly.

These three forms of wisdom are always discussed in this order, indicating that they are a progressive and developmental process, from a more foundational kind of wisdom to a more complete form of wisdom (though this does not indicate one abandons the earlier wisdoms on attaining the latter forms). The three types of wisdom are said to be “generated through practice” (prayogajā). One list of practices which is closely linked to the three types of wisdom are found in various sources, including the Mahāyānasūtrālaṅkāra, and consist of ten practices “associated with the Dharma”: "copying (lekhanā), worshipping (pūjanā), gifting (dānam), hearing (śravaṇam), speaking (vācanam), memorizing (udgrahaṇam), clarifying (prakāśanā), reciting (svādhyāyanam), reflecting (cintanā), and cultivating (bhāvanā)."

While the term prajñā can refer to all kinds of understanding and discernment of Buddhist truths (such as understanding the four noble truths, the various dharmas taught in Abhidharma, the various Buddhist theories of rebirth and enlightenment etc.), the highest kind of prajñā in Mahayana is Prajñāpāramitā, the "Perfection of Wisdom". This is a direct non-conceptual knowledge of the ultimate truth (Dharmadhatu, Thusness, Emptiness, etc), which is both an essential quality for bodhisattvas striving for enlightenment and a genre of texts detailing this profound wisdom. These teachings emphasize the realization of ultimate truth as a means to attain Buddhahood.

According to Paul Williams, Mahayana considers the analysis of prajñā found in the Hinayana and Abhidharma texts to be incomplete in comparison to Mahayana teachings on wisdom. For Mahayana, the abhidharma descriptions of prajñā stops at the discernment of dharmas as the final reality, but Mahayana and some non-Mahayana schools go on to teach that all dharmas (all phenomena) are empty (śūnyatā). Williams goes on to say that the meaning of prajñā according to Mahayana Prajñāpāramitā sutras is ultimately the state of understanding emptiness (śūnyatā). This view of prajñā is found in texts like the Heart Sutra which states that those who want "to practice the profound perfection of wisdom (prajñā) should view things in this way [as empty]". Dale S. Wright explains that while the conceptual view itself is not the perfection of wisdom, it can aid in its attainment.

== See also ==
- Adhiṭṭhāna – Resolute determination, in Buddhism
- Bodhipakkhiya dhamma – Spiritual qualities conducive to Buddhist cultivation
- Dāna – Concept of charity in Indian religions
- Five wisdoms – Buddhist philosophical concept
- Four Noble Truths – Formulaic summary of Buddhist doctrines
- Four ways of knowing – the perfection of action, observing knowing, universal knowing, and great mirror knowing
- Kenshō – Seeing one's "true nature" as inherently empty of a personal self
- Khanti – Buddhist concept of patience, forbearance and forgiveness
- Metta – Buddhist term meaning "loving-kindness"
- Nekkhamma – Buddhist philosophical concept
- Noble Eightfold Path – Buddhist practices leading to liberation from saṃsāra
- Passaddhi – Buddhist philosophical concept
- Sacca – Buddhist term meaning "real" or "true"
- Upekkhā – Concept of equanimity in Buddhism
- Vīrya – Buddhist term
