= Nekkhamma =

Buddhist philosophical concept

Nekkhamma (𑀦𑁂𑀓𑁆𑀔𑀫𑁆𑀫; Sanskrit: नैष्क्राम्य, romanized: naiṣkrāmya) is a Pāli word generally translated as "renunciation" or "the pleasure of renunciation" while also conveying more specifically "giving up the world and leading a holy life" or "freedom from lust, craving and desires." In Buddhism's Noble Eightfold Path, nekkhamma is the first practice associated with "Right Intention." In the Theravada list of ten perfections, nekkhamma is the third practice of "perfection." It involves non-attachment (detachment).

== In the Pali literature ==
=== Renunciation as right intention ===
In the Pali Canon, in a discourse in which the Buddha describes antecedents precipitating his Awakening, the Buddha divided his thoughts between those that impair discernment, cause affliction and deter one from Nirvana on the one hand, and those that have the opposite effect. In the former category, he included thoughts permeated with sensuality, ill-will and harmfulness; in the latter, thoughts permeated with renunciation, non-ill will and harmlessness:

"Whatever a monk keeps pursuing with his thinking & pondering, that becomes the inclination of his awareness. If a monk keeps pursuing thinking imbued with renunciation, abandoning thinking imbued with sensuality, his mind is bent by that thinking imbued with renunciation. If a monk keeps pursuing thinking imbued with non-ill will, abandoning thinking imbued with ill will, his mind is bent by that thinking imbued with non-ill will. If a monk keeps pursuing thinking imbued with harmlessness, abandoning thinking imbued with harmfulness, his mind is bent by that thinking imbued with harmlessness."

These latter three types of thought content — renunciation, non-ill will and harmlessness — comprise the traditional triadic definition of the Noble Eightfold Path's notion of "Right Intention" (Pali: sammā-saṅkappa; Skt.: samyak-saṃkalpa). For each of the former types of thought content — sensuality, ill will and harmfulness — the Buddha stated:

"Whenever thinking imbued with sensuality [or ill will or harmfulness] had arisen, I simply abandoned it, destroyed it, dispelled it, wiped it out of existence."

=== Renunciation vs. sensuality ===
Elsewhere in the Canon, the Buddha more finely juxtaposes the pursuit of thoughts regarding sensuality (kāma) and those regarding renunciation (nekkhamma):

"There is the case where the mind of a monk, when attending to sensual pleasures, doesn't leap up at sensual pleasures, doesn't grow confident, steadfast, or released in sensual pleasures. But when attending to renunciation, his mind leaps up at renunciation, grows confident, steadfast, & released in renunciation. When his mind is rightly-gone, rightly developed, has rightly risen above, gained release, and become disjoined from sensual pleasures, then whatever fermentations, torments, & fevers there are that arise in dependence on sensuality, he is released from them. He does not experience that feeling. This is expounded as the escape from sensual pleasures."

=== Renunciation as a bodhisatta practice ===
As indicated above, in a Pali discourse, the Buddha identified renunciation as part of his path to Awakening. In the Buddhavamsa, Jataka tales and exegetical literature, renunciation is codified as the third of ten practices of "perfection" (pāramī).

== Contemporary elaborations ==
=== Renunciation's benefit ===
Bodhi (1999) elaborates on the various and ultimate benefits of Buddhist renunciation:

"Contemplating the dukkha inherent in desire is one way to incline the mind to renunciation. Another way is to contemplate directly the benefits flowing from renunciation. To move from desire to renunciation is not, as might be imagined, to move from happiness to grief, from abundance to destitution. It is to pass from gross, entangling pleasures to an exalted happiness and peace, from a condition of servitude to one of self-mastery. Desire ultimately breeds fear and sorrow, but renunciation gives fearlessness and joy. It promotes the accomplishment of all three stages of the threefold training: it purifies conduct, aids concentration, and nourishes the seed of wisdom. The entire course of practice from start to finish can in fact be seen as an evolving process of renunciation culminating in Nibbana [Pali; Skt: Nirvana] as the ultimate stage of relinquishment, 'the relinquishing of all foundations of existence' (sabb'upadhipatinissagga)."

== See also ==
- Four Noble Truths
- Noble Eightfold Path
- Bodhipakkhiya dhamma (Qualities conducive to Enlightenment)
- Upādāna (attachment/clinging)
- Tyāga, closely related concept in Hinduism
- Vairagya, closely related concept in Hinduism
- Pāramī (Buddhist Perfections)
  - Pañña (wisdom)
  - Sacca (truth)
  - Adhiṭṭhāna (resolute determination)
  - Dāna (generosity)
  - Passaddhi (tranquillity)
  - Upekkhā (equanimity)
  - Khanti (patience)
  - Metta (loving-kindness)
  - Vīrya (diligence)

== Sources ==
- Bodhi, Bhikkhu (ed.) (1978, 2005). A Treatise on the Paramis: From the Commentary to the Cariyapitaka by Acariya Dhammapala (The Wheel, No. 409/411). Kandy: Buddhist Publication Society. Retrieved 30 Jun 2007 from "Access to Insight" at http://accesstoinsight.org/lib/authors/bodhi/wheel409.html.
- Bodhi, Bhikkhu (1984, 1999). The Noble Eightfold Path: The Way to the End of Suffering (The Wheel, No. 308/311). Kandy: Buddhist Publication Society. Retrieved from "Access to Insight" at http://www.accesstoinsight.org/lib/authors/bodhi/waytoend.html.
- Monier-Williams, Monier (1899, 1964). A Sanskrit-English Dictionary. London: Oxford University Press. ISBN 0-19-864308-X. Retrieved 2008-04-12 from "Cologne University" at http://www.sanskrit-lexicon.uni-koeln.de/scans/MWScan/index.php?sfx=pdf.
- Rhys Davids, T.W. & William Stede (eds.) (1921-5). The Pali Text Society’s Pali–English Dictionary. Chipstead: Pali Text Society. A general on-line search engine for the PED is available at http://dsal.uchicago.edu/dictionaries/pali/.
- Thanissaro Bhikkhu (trans.) (1996). Magga-vibhanga Sutta: An Analysis of the Path (SN 45.8). Retrieved 2 Jul 2007 from "Access to Insight" at http://www.accesstoinsight.org/tipitaka/sn/sn45/sn45.008.than.html.
- Thanissaro Bhikkhu (trans.) (1997). Dvedhavitakka Sutta: Two Sorts of Thinking (MN 19). Retrieved 2 Jul 2007 from "Access to Insight" at http://www.accesstoinsight.org/tipitaka/mn/mn.019.than.html.
- Thanissaro Bhikkhu (trans.) (2000). Nissaraniya Sutta: Leading to Escape (AN 5.200). Retrieved 2 Jul 2007 from "Access to Insight" at http://www.accesstoinsight.org/tipitaka/an/an05/an05.200.than.html.
