= Isaline Blew Horner =

Pali Buddhist Scholar

Isaline Blew Horner OBE
- Born: 30 March 1896; Walthamstow, England
- Died: 25 April 1981 (aged 85)
- Relatives: Ajahn Amaro (cousin)

Academic background
- Education: Newnham College, Cambridge

Academic work
- Discipline: Indologist
- Main interests: Pāli literature

Isaline Blew Horner OBE (30 March 1896 – 25 April 1981), usually cited as I. B. Horner, was an English Indologist, a leading scholar of Pāli literature and late president of the Pali Text Society (1959–1981).

== Life ==
On 30 March 1896 Horner was born in Walthamstow in Essex, England. Horner was a first cousin once removed of the British Theravāda monk Ajahn Amaro.

=== Cambridge years ===
In 1917, at the University of Cambridge's women's college Newnham College, Horner was awarded the title of a B.A. in moral sciences.

After her undergraduate studies, Horner remained at Newnham College, becoming in 1918 an assistant librarian and then, in 1920, acting librarian. In 1921, Horner traveled to Ceylon (now Sri Lanka), India and Burma where she was first introduced to Buddhism, its literature and related languages. In 1923, Horner returned to England, where she accepted a Fellowship at Newnham College and became its librarian. In 1928, she became the first Sarah Smithson Research Fellow in Pāli Studies. In 1930, she published her first book, Women Under Primitive Buddhism. In 1933, she edited her first volume of Pāli text, the third volume of the Papañcasūdanī (Majjhima Nikāya commentary). In 1934, Horner was awarded the title of an M.A. from Cambridge. From 1939 to 1949, she served on Cambridge's Governing Body.

From 1926 to 1959, Horner lived and traveled with her companion "Elsie," Eliza Marian Butler (1885–1959).

=== PTS years ===
In 1936, due to Butler's accepting a position at Manchester University, Horner left Newnham to live in Manchester. There, Horner completed the fourth volume of the Papañcasūdanī (published 1937). In 1938, she published the first volume of a translation of the Vinaya Piṭaka. (She was to publish a translation of the last Vinaya Piṭaka volume in 1966.)

In 1942, Horner became the Honorary Secretary of the Pali Text Society (PTS). In 1943, in response to her parents' needs and greater PTS involvement, Horner moved to London where she lived until her death. In 1959, she became the Society's President and Honorary Treasurer.

=== Honors ===
In 1964, in recognition of her contributions to Pāli literature, Horner was awarded an honorary Ph.D by Ceylon University.

In 1977, Horner received a second honorary Ph.D from Nava Nalanda Mahavihara.

In 1980, Queen Elizabeth II made Horner an Officer of the Order of the British Empire (OBE) for her lifelong contribution to Buddhist literature.

== Books ==
Horner's books include:

- Women under Primitive Buddhism: Laywomen and Almswomen (1930/1975)
- Papañcasūdanī: Majjhimanikāyaṭṭhakathā of Buddhaghosâcariya (1933)
- The Early Buddhist Theory of Man Perfected: A Study of the Arahan Concept and of the Implications of the Aim to Perfection in Religious Life, traced in early canonical and post-canonical Pali literature (1936/1975)
- Book of the Discipline (Vinaya-pitaka) (1938), translated by I. B. Horner
- Alice M. Cooke, a memoir (1940)
- Early Buddhism And The Taking Of Life (1945/1967)
- Madhuratthavilāsinī nāma Buddhavaṃsaṭṭhakathā of Bhadantâcariya Buddhadatta Mahāthera (1946/1978), ed. by I.B. Horner.
- Living Thoughts of Gotama the Buddha (1948/2001), by Ananda K. Coomaraswamy and I.B. Horner
- The Book of Middle Length Sayings, 1954–1959, 3 volumes, Bristol: Pali Text Society
- Ten Jātaka Stories (1957)
- Women In Early Buddhist Literature (1961)
- Early Buddhist Poetry (1963)
- Milinda's Questions (1963), translated by I. B. Horner
- Buddhist Texts through the Ages (1964/1990), translated and edited by Edward Conze in collaboration with I.B. Horner, David Snellgrove, Arthur Waley
- Minor Anthologies of the Pali Canon (vol. 4): Vimanavatthu and Petavatthu (1974), translated by I. B. Horner
- Noble Quest: Ariyapariyesana Sutta (1974)
- Minor Anthologies of the Pali Canon (vol. 3): Buddhavamsa and Cariyapitaka (1975), translated by I. B. Horner
- Apocryphal Birth Stories (Paññāsa Jātaka) (1985), translated by I.B. Horner and Padmanabh S. Jaini
- The Blessed One's City Of Dhamma: From the Milindapañha (1993), translated by I.B. Horner and N.K.G. Mendis (Buddhist Publication Society, Bodhi Leaves No. 130)

== See also ==
- Pali Text Society
- Ajahn Amaro

== Sources ==
- Boucher, Sandy (2007). "Appreciating the Lineage of Buddhist Feminist Scholars", in Rosemary Radford Ruether (ed.) Feminist Theologies (2007). Minneapolis: Fortress Press. ISBN 0-8006-3894-8. Retrieved 2008-08-21 from
- Burford, Grace (2005). "Newnham Biographies: Isaline B. Horner (1896-1981)." Retrieved 2008-08-21 from "Newnham College" at
- Burford, Grace G. (2014). Isaline B. Horner and the Twentieth Century Development of Buddhism in the West. In Todd Lewis (ed), Buddhists: Understanding Buddhism Through the Lives of Practitioners. Wiley. pp. 73–. ISBN 978-1-118-32208-6.
- Jayetilleke, Rohan L. (2007). "The pioneer Pali scholar of the West." Retrieved 2008-08-20 from "Associated Newspapers of Ceylon".
- Norman, K.R. (1982). Isaline Blew Horner (1896-1981) (Obituary), Journal of the International Association of Buddhist Studies 5 (2), 145-149
- University of Cambridge (2007). "Isaline Blew Horner (1896-1981), Pali scholar." Retrieved 2024-04-11.
- Watts, Sheila (2006). "Newnham Biographies: Eliza Marian (Elsie) Butler (1885 – 1959)". Retrieved 2008-08-21
