= Kshanti =

Buddhist concept of patience, forbearance and forgiveness

Kṣānti (Sanskrit) or khanti (Pāli) is patience, forbearance and forgiveness. It is one of the pāramitās in both Theravāda and Mahāyāna Buddhism. The term can be translated as "patience," "steadfastness," or "endurance," and encompasses meanings such as "forbearance," "acceptance," and "receptivity."

Kṣānti has several applications: It can refer to patience with others, that is, the ability to endure abuse and hardship inflicted by sentient beings while maintaining compassion and commitment to their liberation. Kṣānti can also refer to endurance on the path, the resolve to withstand the difficulties encountered during the long journey toward Buddhahood without losing focus on liberating all beings from saṃsāra. Finally, it can also mean receptivity to the truths of reality. This is a profound acceptance of the ultimate truths, including impermanence, suffering, emptiness, and non-self, as realized during advanced stages of meditation.

== Canonical sources ==
Examples in the Pāli canon identify using forbearance in response to others' anger, cuckolding, torture, and even fatal assaults.

=== Dhammapada verses ===
Khanti is the first word of the ovāda-pāṭimokkha gātha (Pāli for "pāṭimokkha Exhortation Verse"), found in the Dhammapada, verse 184:

Patient endurance:

the foremost austerity.

Unbinding:

the foremost,
so say the Awakened.

He who injures another

is no contemplative.

He who mistreats another,

no monk.

Khantī

paramaṃ tapo tītikkhā

Nibbānaṃ

paramaṃ
vadanti buddhā,

Na hi pabbajito

parūpaghātī

Samaṇo hoti

paraṃ viheṭhayanto

Elsewhere in the Dhammapada, khanti is found in verse 399:

He endures—unangered—
insult, assault, & imprisonment.
His army is strength;
his strength, forbearance:
he's what I call
a brahman.

=== Lord Sakka's restraint ===
In the Samyutta Nikaya, the Buddha tells of an ancient battle between devas and asuras during which the devas were victorious and the asura king Vepacitti was captured and imprisoned. When the deva lord Sakka visited Vepacitti in prison, Vepacitti "abused and reviled him with rude, harsh words," to which Sakka did not respond in kind. Afterwards, Sakka's charioteer questioned Sakka about this, expressing concern that some would see Sakka's response as indicative of fear or weakness. Sakka replied:

It is neither through fear nor weakness
That I am patient with Vepacitti.
How can a wise person like me
Engage in combat with a fool?
...Of goals that culminate in one's own good
None is found better than patience.
...One who repays an angry man with anger
Thereby makes things worse for himself.
Not repaying an angry man with anger,
One wins a battle hard to win.
He practices for the welfare of both,
His own and the other's,
When, knowing that his foe is angry,
He mindfully maintains his peace.
When he achieves the cure of both—
His own and the other's—
The people who consider him a fool
Are unskilled in the Dhamma.

The Buddha then praised Sakka to his followers for "patience and gentleness" (khantisoraccassa).

=== A cuckold's forbearance ===
In a Jātaka tale, Exposition on Patience Birth Story (Khanti-vaṇṇana-jātaka: J 225), the Buddha tells of a former life when he was Brahmadatta, a king of Benares. At the time, a courtier of the king "fell into an intrigue in the king's harem." This same courtier was being similarly betrayed by one of his own servants and complained to the king about that servant. In response, the king disclosed his knowledge of the courtier's betrayal and stated:

Good men, I trow, are rare enow: so patience is my rede.

Shamed by the king's awareness of their deeds, the courtier and his servant henceforth ceased their betrayals.

=== Parables of torture ===
The Majjhima Nikāya has a classic parable of Buddhist forbearance, the Buddha's Simile of the Saw:

Monks, even if bandits were to carve you up savagely, limb by limb, with a two-handled saw, he among you who let his heart get angered even at that would not be doing my bidding. Even then you should train yourselves: "Our minds will be unaffected and we will say no evil words. We will remain sympathetic, with a mind of good will, and with no inner hate. We will keep pervading these people with an awareness imbued with good will and, beginning with them, we will keep pervading the all-encompassing world with an awareness imbued with good will—abundant, expansive, immeasurable, free from hostility, free from ill will." That's how you should train yourselves.

Similarly, in the Jātaka Tale Patience Teacher Birth Story (Khantivādī Jātaka: J 313), a jealous king repeatedly asked an ascetic what the ascetic taught, to which the ascetic replied, "Patience," which the ascetic further defined as "not to get angry when injured, criticized or struck." To test the ascetic's patience, the king had the ascetic struck two thousand times with a whip of thorns, had the ascetic's hands and feet axed off, cut off the ascetic's nose and ears, and then kicked the ascetic in the heart. After the king left, the ascetic wished the king a long life and said, "Those like myself do not feel wrath." The ascetic died later that day.

== Mahayana ==
Kṣānti (Tibetan: bzod pa; Chinese: 忍辱, renru; Japanese: ninniku) is one of the six pāramitās in Mahayana Buddhism and is thus a central aspect of the bodhisattva path. In the path of preparation (prayogamārga), kṣānti serves as one of the "aids to penetration" (nirvedhabhāgīya), marking a transition to the direct vision of the Four Noble Truths (darśanamārga). It bridges mundane cultivation and supramundane realization, leading to deeper insight into these truths.

=== Anutpattikadharmakṣānti ===
Mahāyāna and some northern Buddhist sources also teach a special doctrine on the term anutpattikadharmakṣānti (Tibetan: mi skye ba’i chos la bzod pa; Chinese: 無生法忍, wushengfaren): "receptivity to the non-production of dharmas." In Mahāyāna, this denotes a bodhisattva's unwavering conviction that all phenomena (dharmas) are intrinsically "unproduced" (anutpāda) and "empty" (śūnyatā), lacking any inherent essence (niḥsvabhāva).

This realization is crucial for attaining the stage of nonretrogression (avaivartika), often identified with the first or eighth bhūmi on the bodhisattva path. It empowers the bodhisattva to persist in benefiting others, recognizing that ultimately there is no self to liberate and no beings to save. This insight inoculates the practitioner against the temptation to prematurely abandon the bodhisattva path for personal liberation and emphasizes the nonduality of saṃsāra and nirvāṇa.

In non-Mahāyāna contexts, the term anutpattikadharmakṣānti aligns with the realization of no-self (anātman) and the Four Noble Truths, marking the darśanamārga.

== General sources ==
- Bodhi, Bhikkhu (2000). The Connected Discourses of the Buddha: A Translation of the Saṃyutta Nikāya. Somerville, Mass.: Wisdom Publications. ISBN 0-86171-331-1.
- A Chanting Guide. Dhammayut Order in the United States of America. 1994. Archived from the original on 2009-03-06.
- Nandisena, Bhikkhu (2000). "Khantivadi Jataka". El Centro Mexicano del Buddhismo Theravada. J 313. Archived from the original on 2000-06-21.
- Rhys Davids, T.W.; Stede, William, eds. (1921–25). The Pali Text Society’s Pali–English Dictionary. Chipstead: Pali Text Society. A general on-line search engine for this dictionary is available at http://dsal.uchicago.edu/dictionaries/pali/.
- Cowell, E.B., ed. (2006) [1895]. The Jātaka or Stories of the Buddha's Former Births. Vol. II. Translated by Rouse, W.H.D. Cambridge: Cambridge University Press.
- "Brahmanavagga: Brahmans". Access to Insight. Translated by Thanissaro, Bhikkhu. 1997a. Dhp XXVI.
- "Buddhavagga: Awakened". Access to Insight. Translated by Thanissaro, Bhikkhu. 1997b. Dhp XIV.
- "Kakacupama Sutta: The Simile of the Saw (excerpt)". Access to Insight. Translated by Thanissaro, Bhikkhu. 1997c. MN 21.
