= Seven Factors of Awakening =

Spiritual qualities for Buddhist Awakening

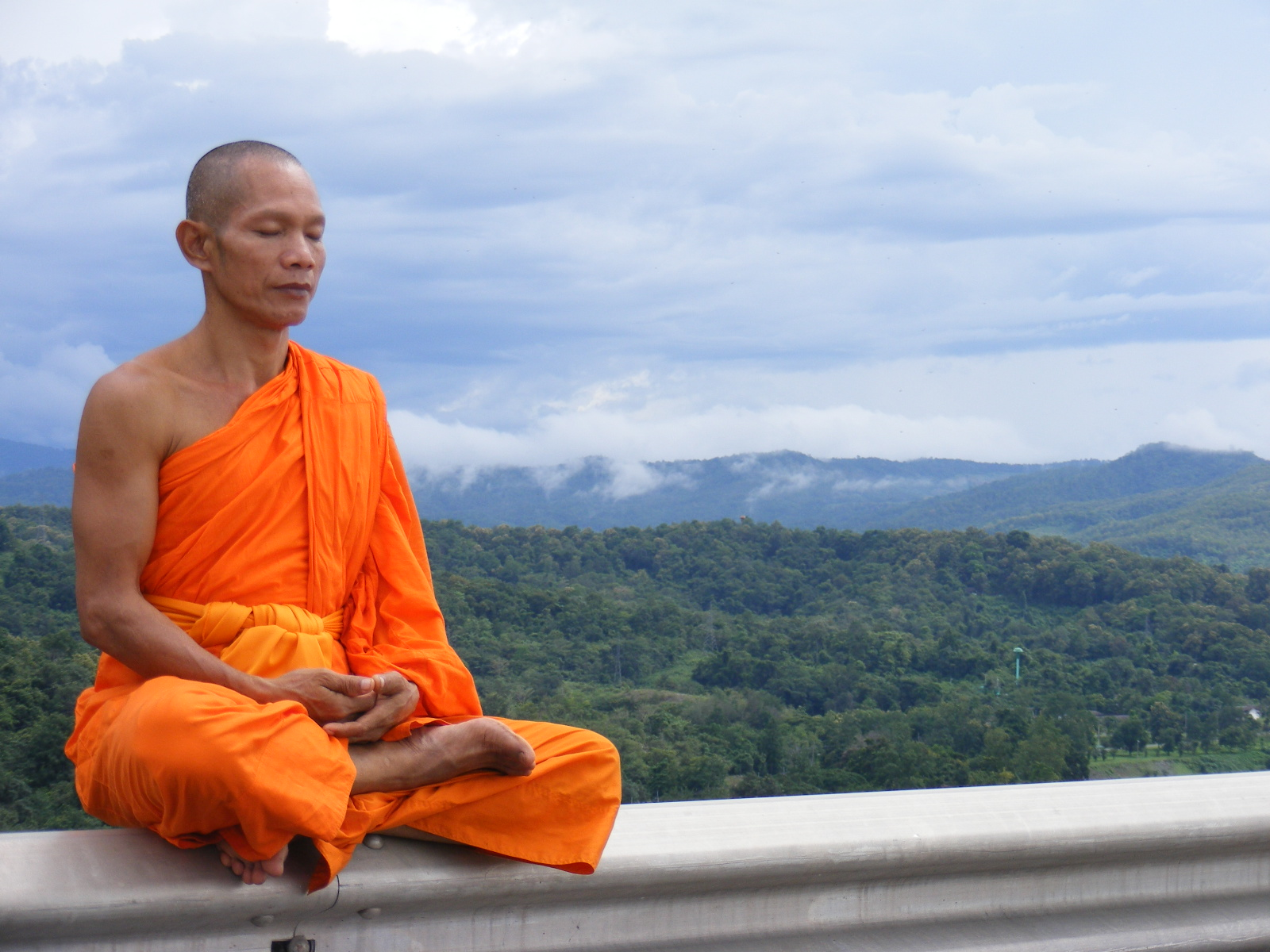
Monk meditating beside Sirikit Dam in Thailand.

In Buddhism, the seven factors of awakening (Pali: satta bojjhaṅgā or satta sambojjhaṅgā; Skt.: sapta bodhyanga) are:

- Mindfulness (sati, Sanskrit smṛti). To maintain awareness of reality, in particular the teachings (Dhamma).
- Investigation of the nature of reality (dhamma vicaya, Skt. dharmapravicaya).
- Energy (viriya, Skt. vīrya) also determination, effort
- Joy or rapture (pīti, Skt. prīti)
- Relaxation or tranquility (passaddhi, Skt. prashrabdhi) of both body and mind
- Concentration (samādhi) a calm, one-pointed state of mind, or "bringing the buried latencies or samskaras into full view"
- Equanimity (upekkhā, Skt. upekshā). To accept reality as-it-is (yathā-bhuta) without craving or aversion.

This evaluation of seven awakening factors is one of the "seven sets" of "awakening-related states" (bodhipakkhiyadhamma).

The Pali word bojjhanga is a compound of bodhi ("awakening," "enlightenment") and anga ("factor").

== Etymology ==
Satta sambojjhaṅgā:

- satta – seven;
- sam- - a prefix meaning complete, full, highest
- bojjh(i) < bodhi – an abstract noun formed from the verbal root *budh- (to awake, become aware, notice, know or understand) corresponding to the verbs bujjhati (Pāli) and bodhati or budhyate (Sanskrit);
- aṅga – a part of a whole; factor, cause.

Bhikkhu Bodhi notes that, in the Pali canon, the word bojjhaṅga is likely a dative tappurisa compound, and thus should be translated as a "factor for enlightenment," that is, as a factor leading towards (and, initially, prior to) enlightenment. However, in the Pali commentaries, bojjhaṅga is treated as a genitive tappurisa, as if it were a "factor of enlightment," suggesting that these factors are the result of (and subsequent to) enlightenment.

== Pali literature ==
In the Sutta Pitaka's Samyutta Nikaya, the bojjhangas refer to wholesome, mundane factors leading to enlightenment. In the Abhidhamma and Pali commentaries, the bojjhangas tend to refer to supramundane factors concurrent with enlightenment.

=== Sutta Pitaka ===
According to one discourse in the Samyutta Nikaya entitled "Bhikkhu Sutta" (SN 46.5):

[Bhikkhu:] "Venerable sir, it is said, 'factors of enlightenment, factors of enlightenment.' In what sense are they called factors of enlightenment?"
[Buddha:] "They lead to enlightenment, bhikkhu, therefore they are called factors of enlightenment...."

During meditation, one may contemplate the seven Factors of Enlightenment as well as on their antithesis, the Five Hindrances (sensual pleasure, ill-will, sloth-torpor, restlessness-worry, doubt). In addition, one Samyutta Nikaya sutta identifies developing each of the enlightenment factors accompanied by each of the four brahma viharas (loving kindness, compassion, sympathetic joy, equanimity).

In the Samyutta Nikaya's "Fire Discourse," the Buddha identifies that mindfulness is "always useful" (sabbatthika); while, when one's mind is sluggish, one should develop the enlightenment factors of investigation, energy and joy; and, when one's mind is excited, one should develop the enlightenment factors of tranquility, concentration and equanimity.

Again according to the Samyutta Nikaya, once when the Buddha was gravely ill he asked Venerable Mahacunda to recite the seven Factors of Enlightenment to him. In such a way the Buddha was cured of his illness.

=== Treatises ===
In the Visuddhimagga, in a section discussing skills needed for the attainment and maintenance of absorption (jhana), Buddhaghosa identifies the bojjhangas in the following fashion:

- "Strong mindfulness ... is needed in all instances...."
- "When his mind is slack with over-laxness of energy, etc., then ... he should develop those [three enlightenment factors] beginning with investigation-of-states..." (i.e., dhamma vicaya, viriya, piti).
- "When his mind is agitated through over-energeticness, etc., then ... he should develop those [three enlightenment factors] beginning with tranquility..." (i.e., passaddhi, samadhi, upekkha).

== Meditation ==
Balancing enlightenment factors & hindrances
- Investigation (dhamma vicaya)
- Energy (viriya)
- Joy or rapture (pīti)
to be used when experiencing
sloth & torpor (thīna-middha)
to regain mindfulness
- Mindfulness (sati)
the balancing factor
- Relaxation (passaddhi)
- Concentration (samādhi)
- Equanimity (upekkha)
to be used when experiencing
restlessness & worry
(uddhacca-kukkucca)
to regain mindfulness

The seven factors of awakening are closely related to the practice of dhyana, resembling the various factors that are part of the four dhyanas.

In meditation everyone most likely experiences two of the five hindrances (Pāli: pañca nīvaraṇāni). They are sloth and torpor (Pāli: thīna-middha), which is half-hearted action with little or no collectedness, and restlessness and worry (uddhacca-kukkucca), which is the inability to calm the mind.

As indicated above, in the "Fire Discourse" (SN 46.53), it is recommended that investigation, energy and joy are to be developed when experiencing sloth and torpor. Relaxation, concentration, and equanimity are to be developed when experiencing restlessness or worry. Mindfulness should be constantly present to remain aware of physical change as well as mental change in either skillful or unskillful direction.

== See also ==
- Five Strengths – Buddhist philosophical concept
- Iddhipāda – Compound term composed of power, potency, base, basis or constituent
- Pāramitā – Buddhist qualities for spiritual perfection
- Reality in Buddhism – Buddhist system of natural laws which constitute the natural order of things
