= Dhamma vicaya =

Internal discrimination in Buddhism

In Buddhism, dhamma vicaya (Pali; Sanskrit: धर्मविचय-) has been variously translated as the "analysis of qualities," "discrimination of dhammas," (Note: In regards to his leaving dhamma untranslated, Gethin 1992 summarizes (p. 151): "The point I wish to make, however, is that the usage of the word dhamma (in the plural) remains in the Nikāyas, canonical Abhidhamma, and even to some extent in the commentarial tradition, a somewhat ambiguous and multivalent term. Its precise understanding continues to be elusive and defies rigid or fixed definition. Possibly this is no accident and the texts delight in the very fluidity of the term." In the context of dhamma-vicaya, Gethin puts forth the idea (p. 152, also see p. 154): "In Buddhist thought to take dhamma apart is, I think, to be left with dhammas. Dhamma-vicaya means, then, either the 'discrimination of dhammas' or the 'discernment of dhamma'; to discriminate dhammas is precisely to discern dhamma. In a related footnote (p. 152, n. 38), Gethin expresses doubt about translating vicaya as "investigation.") "discrimination of states," "investigation of doctrine," (Note: Entry for "Vicaya"), 693 ("Sambojjhanga").) and "searching the Truth." The meaning is ambivalent; it implies the investigation of the Buddhist teachings (dhamma), but also the application of discernment to body-mind phenomena in order to apply right effort, giving way to entry into the first jhana.

== Etymology ==
According to Rupert Gethin, "Dhamma-vicaya means either the 'discrimination of dhammas' or the 'discernment of dhamma'; to discriminate dhammas is precisely to discern dhamma."

== Textual appearances ==
=== Seven factors of Awakening ===
In the Pali canon's Sutta Pitaka, this is the second of the Seven Factors of Awakening (satta bojjhaṅgā). It is preceded by the establishment of mindfulness (sati) and applied with energy/effort (viriya) Together, mindfulness, discernment and effort calm the mind, and give way to the onset of the jhanas, which are characterised by the remaining four factors of awakening, namely rapture (piti), tranquility (passaddhi), unification (samadhi) and equanimity (upekkha). (Note: See, e.g., MN 118 (Thanissaro, 2006).) According to the Samyutta Nikaya, this factor is to be developed by paying continuous careful attention (yoniso manasikāra bahulīkāro) to the following states (dhammā): wholesome and unwholesome (kusalā-akusalā); blameable and blameless (sāvajjā-anavajjā); inferior and superior (hīna-paṇītā); and, evil and good (kaṇha-sukka). An alternate explanation in the nikayas is that this factor is aroused by "discriminating that Dhamma with wisdom" (taṃ dhammaṃ paññāya pavicināti).

=== Abhidhamma ===
The Abhidhamma's Dhammasaṅgaṇi even more strongly associates dhamma vicaya with paññā (wisdom) in its enumeration of wholesome states (kusalā dhammā):

What on that occasion is the faculty of wisdom (paññindriyaṃ)?
The wisdom which there is on that occasion is understanding, search, research, searching the Truth....

where "searching the Truth" is C.A.F. Rhys Davids' translation of dhammavicayo.

In later Abhidhamma texts and in post-canonical literature (such as those by the 4th-century CE Indian scholar Vasubandhu), dhamma vicaya refers to the study of dhamma as physical or mental phenomena that constitute absolute reality (Pali: paramattha; Skt.: paramārtha).

== See also ==
- Bodhipakkhiya dhamma
- Prajna
- Three marks of existence
- Vipassana

== Sources ==
- Bodhi, Bhikkhu (2000), The Connected Discourses of the Buddha: A Translation of the Samyutta Nikaya, Boston: Wisdom Publications, ISBN 0-86171-331-1
- Gethin, R.M.L. (1992), The Buddhist Path to Awakening: A Study of the Bodhi-Pakkhiyā Dhammā, Leiden: E.J. Brill, ISBN 90-04-09442-3
- Rhys Davids, Caroline A.F. (2003) [1900], Buddhist Manual of Psychological Ethics, of the Fourth Century B.C., Being a Translation, now made for the First Time, from the Original Pāli, of the First Book of the Abhidhamma-Piṭaka, entitled Dhamma-Saṅgaṇi (Compendium of States or Phenomena), Whitefish, MT: Kessinger Publishing, ISBN 0-7661-4702-9
- Rhys Davids, T.W.; Stede, William (1921–1925), The Pali Text Society's Pali–English Dictionary, Chipstead: Pali Text Society. A general on-line search engine for the PED is available at http://dsal.uchicago.edu/dictionaries/pali/.
- Thanissaro Bhikkhu (trans.) (1995). Ananda Sutta: To Ananda (On Mindfulness of Breathing) (SN 54.13). Retrieved 2008-07-07 from "Access to Insight" at http://www.accesstoinsight.org/tipitaka/sn/sn54/sn54.013.than.html.
- Thanissaro, Bhikkhu (1996), Wings to Awakening
- Thanissaro Bhikkhu (trans.) (2006). Anapanasati Sutta: Mindfulness of Breathing (MN 118). Retrieved 2008-07-07 from "Access to Insight" at http://www.accesstoinsight.org/tipitaka/mn/mn.118.than.html.
- Williams, Paul (1989; repr. 2007). Mahayana Buddhism. London: Routledge. ISBN 978-0-415-02537-9.
