= Brahmavihara =

Four virtues In Buddhist ethic

Translations of Brahmavihāra
- English: four divine abodes
- Pali: cattāro brahmavihārā
- Burmese: ဗြဟ္မဝိဟာရတရားလေးပါး
- Chinese: 四無量心 (Pinyin: sì wúliàng xīn)
- Japanese: 四無量心 (Rōmaji: shimuryōshin)
- Khmer: ព្រហ្មវិហារ (UNGEGN: prôhmâvĭhar)
- Korean: 사무량심 (RR: samulyangsim)
- Lao: ພົມວິຫານ (phomwihan)
- Sinhala: සතර බ්‍රහ්ම විහරණ (sathara brahma viharana)
- Tagalog: Blahmabihala
- Tibetan: ཚངས་པའི་གནས་བཞི་ (tshangs pa'i gnas bzhi)
- Thai: พรหมวิหาร (RTGS: phrom wihan)
- Vietnamese: Tứ vô lượng tâm Bốn Phạm trú 四無量心 四梵住

The brahmavihārā (sublime attitudes, lit. "abodes of Brahma") is a series of four Buddhist virtues and the meditation practices made to cultivate them. They are also known as the four immeasurables (Pāli: appamaññā) or four infinite minds (Chinese: 四無量心). The brahmavihārā are:

1. loving-kindness or benevolence (mettā)
2. compassion (karuṇā)
3. empathetic joy (muditā)
4. equanimity (upekkhā)

According to the Metta Sutta, cultivation of the four immeasurables has the power to cause the practitioner to be reborn into a "Brahma realm" (Pāli: Brahmaloka).

== Etymology and translations ==
- Pāli: cattāro brahmavihārā
- Sinhala: සතර බ්‍රහ්මවිහාරා (sathara brahmavihārā)
- Tibetan: ཚད་མེད་བཞི། | (Wylie: tshad med bzhi)

Brahmavihārā may be parsed as "Brahma" and "vihāra", which is often rendered into English as "sublime" or "divine abodes".

Apramāṇa, usually translated as "the immeasurables", means "boundlessness, infinitude, a state that is illimitable". When developed to a high degree in meditation, these attitudes are said to make the mind "immeasurable" and like the mind of the loving Brahma (gods).

Other translations:

- English: four divine abodes, four divine emotions, four sublime attitudes, four divine dwellings.
- East Asia: (traditional Chinese and Japanese: 四無量心; ; pinyin: Sì wúliàng xīn; rōmaji: shimuryōshin; Korean: 사무량심; Vietnamese: Tứ Vô Lượng Tâm; lit. 'four immeasurable states of mind, from apramāṇa-citta'), (traditional Chinese: 四等(心); ; pinyin: sì děng; lit. 'four equalities/universals'), (traditional Chinese: 四梵行; ; pinyin: sì fàn xíng; lit. 'noble Brahma-acts/characteristics').
- Tibetan: ཚངས་པའི་གནས་བཞི་, Wylie: . tshangs pa'i gnas bzhi (four brahmavihara) or Tibetan: ཚད་མེད་བཞི, Wylie: tshad med bzhi (four immeasurables).

== The brahmavihārā ==
The four brahmavihārā are:

1. Loving-kindness (Pāli: mettā, Sinhala: මෛත්‍රිය (maitriya)), or active good will towards all;
2. Compassion (Pāli and Sinhala: කරුණා (karuṇā)) results from metta, identifying the suffering of others as one's own;
3. Sympathetic joy (Pāli and Sinhala: මුදිතා (mudita)) results from metta: the feeling of joy because others are happy, even if one did not contribute to it, as a form of sympathetic joy;
4. Equanimity (Pāli: upekkhā, Sinhala: උපේක්ෂා (upekshā)): even-mindedness and serenity, treating everyone impartially.

=== Early Buddhism ===
The brahmavihārā is a pre-Buddhist Brahminical concept, to which the Buddhist tradition gave its interpretation. The Digha Nikaya asserts that according to Buddha, "brahmavihārā is "that practice," and he then contrasts it with "my practice" as follows:

...that practice [namely, the mere cultivation of love and so forth, according to the fourfold instructions] is conducive not to turning away, nor to dispassion, nor quiet, nor to cessation, nor to direct knowledge, nor to enlightenment, nor nirvana, but only to rebirth in the world of Brahma.

...my practice is conducive to complete turning away, dispassion, cessation, quieting, direct knowledge, enlightenment, and nirvana – specifically the eightfold noble path (...)

— The Buddha, Digha Nikaya II.251, Translated by Harvey B. Aronson

According to Richard Gombrich, an Indologist and scholar of Sanskrit, Pāli, the Buddhist usage of the brahmavihārā originally referred to an awakened state of mind, and a concrete attitude towards other beings which was equal to "living with Brahman" here and now. The later tradition took those descriptions too literal, linking them to cosmology and understanding them as "living with Brahman" by rebirth in the Brahma world. According to Gombrich, "The Buddha taught that kindness – what Christians tend to call love – was a way to salvation.

In the Tevijja Sutta, "The Threefold Knowledge" in the Digha Nikāya or "Collection of the Long Discourses", a group of young Brahmins consulted Lord Buddha about the methods to seek fellowship/companionship/communion with Brahma. He replied that he knows the world of Brahma and the way to it, and explains the meditative method for reaching it by using an analogy of the resonance of the conch shell of the aṣṭamaṅgala:

A monk suffuses the world in the four directions with a mind of benevolence, then above, and below, and all around – the whole world from all sides, completely, with a benevolent, all-embracing, great, boundless, peaceful and friendly mind ... Just as a powerful conch-blower makes himself heard with no great effort in all four [cardinal] directions, so too is there no limit to the unfolding of [this] heart-liberating benevolence. This is a way to communion with Brahma.

The Buddha then said that the monk must follow this up with an equal suffusion of the entire world with mental projections of compassion, sympathetic joy, and equanimity (regarding all beings with an eye for equality).

In the two Metta Suttas of the Aṅguttara Nikāya, the Buddha states that those who practice radiating the four immeasurables in this life and die "without losing it" are destined for rebirth in a heavenly realm in their next life. In addition, if such a person is a Buddhist disciple (Pāli: sāvaka) and thus realizes the three characteristics of the five aggregates, then after his heavenly life, this disciple will reach nibbāna. Even if one is not a disciple, one will still attain the heavenly life, after which, however depending on what his past deeds may have been, one may be reborn in a hell realm, or as an animal or hungry ghost.

In another sutta in the Aṅguttara Nikāya, the laywoman Sāmāvatī is mentioned as an example of someone who excels at loving-kindness. In the Buddhist tradition she is often referred to as such, often citing an account that an arrow shot at her was warded off through her spiritual power.

=== Visuddhimagga ===
The four immeasurables are explained in The Path of Purification (Visuddhimagga), written in the fifth century CE by the scholar and commentator Buddhaghoṣa. They are often practiced by taking each of the immeasurables in turn and applying it to oneself (a practice taught by many contemporary teachers and monastics that was established after the Pāli Suttas were completed), and then to others nearby, and so on to everybody in the world, and everybody in all universes.

=== A Cavern of Treasures (mDzod-phug) ===
A Cavern of Treasures (Tibetan: མཛོད་ཕུག, Wylie: mdzod phug) is a Bonpo terma uncovered by Shenchen Luga (Tibetan: གཤེན་ཆེན་ཀླུ་དགའ, Wylie: gshen-chen klu-dga') in the early eleventh century. A segment of it enshrines a Bonpo evocation of the four immeasurables. Martin (n.d.: p. 21) identifies the importance of this scripture for studies of the Zhang-Zhung language.

== Origins ==
Before the advent of the Buddha, according to Martin Wiltshire, the pre-Buddhist traditions of Brahmāloka, meditation, and these four virtues are evidenced in both early Buddhist and non-Buddhist literature. The Early Buddhist Texts assert that pre-Buddha ancient Indian sages who taught these virtues were earlier incarnations of the Buddha. Post-Buddha, these same virtues are found in the Hindu texts such as verse 1.33 of the Yoga Sutras of Patanjali.

Three of the four immeasurables, namely maitrī, karuṇā, and upekṣā, are found in the later Upanishads, while all four are found with slight variations – such as pramodā instead of muditā – in Jainism literature, states Wiltshire. The ancient Indian Paccekabuddhas mentioned in the early Buddhist Suttas – those who attained nibbāna before the Buddha – mention all "four immeasurables."

According to British scholar of Buddhism Peter Harvey, the Buddhist scriptures acknowledge that the four brahmavihārā meditation practices "did not originate within the Buddhist tradition". The Buddha never claimed that the "four immeasurables" were his unique ideas, like "cessation, quieting, nirvana".

A shift in Vedic ideas, from rituals to virtues, is particularly discernible in the early Upanishad thought, and it is unclear as to what extent and how early Upanishad traditions and Sraman traditions such as Buddhism and Jainism influenced each other on ideas such as "four immeasurables", meditation, and brahmavihārā.

In an authoritative Jain scripture, the Tattvartha Sutra (Chapter 7, sutra 11), there is a mention of four right sentiments: maitrī, pramodā, karuṇā, and mādhyastha:

Benevolence towards all living beings, joy at the sight of the virtuous, compassion and sympathy for the afflicted, and tolerance towards the insolent and ill-behaved.

== Sources ==
- Bodhi, Bhikkhu (2012), The Numerical Discourses of the Buddha: A Translation of the Aṅguttara Nikāya, Boston: Wisdom Publications, ISBN 978-1-61429-040-7
- Gombrich, Richard F. (1997), How Buddhism Began, Munshiram Manoharlal

== See also ==
- Karuṇā – Sanskrit term translated as empathy, compassion or mercy
- Metta – Buddhist term meaning "loving-kindness"
- Mudita – Sympathetic or vicarious joy in Sanskrit and Pali
- Upekkha – Concept of equanimity in Buddhism
