= Mudita =

Sympathetic or vicarious joy in Sanskrit and Pali

Translations of Mudita
- English: Sympathetic joy
- Sanskrit: मुदिता
- Pali: मुदिता
- Burmese: မုဒိတာ (MLCTS: mṵdḭtà)
- Chinese: 喜 (Pinyin: xǐ)
- Japanese: 喜 (Rōmaji: ki)
- Khmer: មុទិតា (UNGEGN: mŭtĭta)
- Sinhala: මුදිතා
- Tagalog: Mudita
- Thai: มุทิตา (RTGS: muthitaa)
- Vietnamese: hỷ

Muditā (Pāli and Sanskrit: मुदिता) is a dharmic concept of joy, particularly an especially sympathetic or vicarious joy—the pleasure that comes from delighting in other people's well-being.

== Buddhism ==
Mudita meditation cultivates appreciative joy at the success and good fortune of others. The Buddha described this variety of meditation in this way:

Here, O, Monks, a disciple lets his mind pervade one quarter of the world with thoughts of unselfish joy, and so the second, and so the third, and so the fourth. And thus the whole wide world, above, below, around, everywhere and equally, he continues to pervade with a heart of unselfish joy, abundant, grown great, measureless, without hostility or ill-will. (DN 13)

Thus, mudita is also referred to as 'unselfish joy'. The cultivation of virtues is manifested in the way that Buddhism is lived and practiced. Gavin Douglas notes that mudita and metta are 'associated with the act of sounding and hearing the bells' by the pagoda.

Mudita is traditionally regarded as the most difficult to cultivate of the four immeasurables (brahmavihārā: also "four sublime attitudes"). To show joy is to celebrate happiness and achievement in others even when we are facing tragedy ourselves. Sayadaw U Pandita notes that mudita does not consist of false joy or envy. This means that deriving pleasure from the misfortune of others is not mudita, and neither are 'deceitful smirks' and 'false compliments'.

The "far enemies" of joy are jealousy (envy) and greed, mind-states in obvious opposition. Joy's "near enemy", the quality which superficially resembles joy but is in fact more subtly in opposition to it, is exhilaration, described as a grasping at pleasant experience out of a sense of insufficiency or lack.

== Hinduism ==
Mudita is discussed in Sutra 1.33 of Patanjali's Yoga Sutras. Translated as 'joy' by James Wood, the Yoga Sutras state that the cultivation of mudita leads to the stability of the mind. Vacaspati Misra, in his commentary on Yoga Sutra 1.33, further adds that mudita should be cultivated towards those who have acquired merit and compassion should be cultivated towards those who are in pain. Vacaspati Misra argues that when the virtue of mudita is acquired, jealousy towards those who have acquired merit is counterbalanced.

== See also ==
- Brahmavihara
- Karuṇā (compassion)
- Metta (loving-kindness)
- Mindstream
- Pīti (joy)
- Sukha (happiness)
- Upekkha (equanimity)
- Similar concepts in other cultures:
  - Compersion—in polyamory, positive feelings experienced by an individual when their intimate partner is enjoying another relationship
  - Firgun—A Hebrew term with a similar meaning
  - Naches—A Yiddish term with a very similar meaning
