= Karuṇā =

Sanskrit term translated as empathy, compassion or mercy

Translations of Karuṇā
- English: Compassion
- Bengali: করুণা (kôruṇa)
- Burmese: ကရုဏာ (MLCTS: ɡəjṵnà)
- Chinese: 慈悲 (Pinyin: cíbēi)
- Indonesian: Belas kasih; belas kasihan; welas asih
- Japanese: 慈悲 (Rōmaji: jihi)
- Khmer: ករុណា (UNGEGN: kârŭna)
- Korean: 비
- Sinhala: කරුණා
- Tagalog: Kaluna
- Tamil: கருணை (Karuṇai)
- Tibetan: སྙིངརྗེ
- Thai: กรุณา (RTGS: karuna)
- Vietnamese: Bi (Chữ Nôm: 悲)

Karuṇā (Sanskrit: करुणा) is generally translated as compassion or mercy and sometimes as self-compassion or spiritual longing. It is a significant spiritual concept in the Indic religions of Hinduism, Buddhism, Sikhism, and Jainism.

== Hinduism ==
In Hinduism, Karuṇā is one of the fundamental virtues that a spiritual aspirant is encouraged to cultivate. Many Hindu deities are depicted as embodiments of compassion. Karuṇā is often linked with other virtues such as "Maitrī" (Pali: mettā; loving-kindness) and "Ahimsa" (non-violence). Together, these virtues form the foundation of a righteous and spiritually fulfilling life. The word comes from the Sanskrit kara, meaning “to do” or “to make,” indicating an action-based form of compassion, rather than the pity or sadness associated with the English word. In Hindu mythology, the concept of "Karuṇā" or compassionate action is deeply embedded and is often illustrated through stories, characters, and teachings. Each avatar's story of Hindu pantheon is an embodiment of divine compassion in action. For instance, in Shiva Tandava Stotra, Shiva is described as Karunavataram, meaning compassion personified.

=== Navarasa ===
Karuna is one of the nine primary rasas (aesthetic principles) in classical Indian arts and literature."Karuṇā Rasa," or the sentiment of compassion, is a pivotal theme in the Ramayana, one of India's principal epics. The narrative commences with the sage Valmiki observing a tragic incident involving a pair of krauncha birds (Sarus cranes), setting the emotional tone for the epic. Witnessing the male bird being killed by a hunter, leaving its partner in anguish, Valmiki is moved to curse the hunter through a spontaneous verse, which ultimately becomes the Ramayana's first shloka (verse). This moment, steeped in sorrow and compassion, not only initiates the composition of the epic but also symbolically prefigures the central narrative of love, loss, and separation experienced by the protagonists, Rama and Sita, embodying the essence of "Karuṇā Rasa." Following this, the god Brahma instructs Valmiki to write Rama's story, revealing the entire tale to him.

=== Yoga ===
The foundational work of Yoga, Patanjali's Yoga Sutras—a comprehensive compilation of Sanskrit aphorisms elucidating the theory and practice of yoga—specifically emphasise the concept of Karuna.

The verse maitrī-karuṇā-muditopekṣaṇāṃ sukha-duḥkha-puṇyāpuṇya-viṣayāṇāṃ bhāvanātaś citta-prasādanam advocates for the cultivation of friendliness (Maitri), compassion (Karuna), joy (Mudita), and equanimity (Upeksha) in response to life's dualities: happiness (Sukha) and suffering (Duhkha), as well as moral virtue (Punya (Hinduism)) and vice (Apunya). This practice, according to Patanjali, is instrumental in achieving a state of mental tranquility (Chittaprasadanam), underscoring the psychological and ethical dimensions integral to yoga's philosophical framework.

== Buddhism ==
Karuṇā is important in all schools of Buddhism. For Theravada Buddhists, dwelling in karuṇā is a means for attaining a happy present life and heavenly rebirth. For Mahāyāna Buddhists, karuṇā is a co-requisite for becoming a Bodhisattva.

According to Sangye Khadro's book Awakening a Kind Heart, karuṇā can be described as the wish for all sentient beings to be free from suffering and its causes. However, in order to benefit others, it needs to be balanced with clear wisdom (paññā) to act objectively.

=== Theravada Buddhism ===
In Theravāda Buddhism, karuṇā is one of the four "divine abodes" (brahmavihāra), along with loving kindness (Pāli: mettā), sympathetic joy (mudita), and equanimity (upekkha). In the Pali canon, Gautama Buddha recommends cultivating these four virtuous mental states to both householders and monastics. When one develops these four states, Buddha counsels radiating them in all directions, as in the following stock canonical phrase regarding karuṇā:

He keeps pervading the first direction—as well as the second direction, the third, and the fourth—with an awareness imbued with compassion. Thus he keeps pervading above, below, & all around, everywhere & in every respect the all-encompassing cosmos with an awareness imbued with compassion: abundant, expansive, immeasurable, free from hostility, free from ill will.

Such a practice purifies one's mind, avoids evil-induced consequences, leads to happiness in one's present life, and, if there is a future karmic rebirth, it will be in a heavenly realm.

The Pali commentaries distinguish between karuṇā and mettā in the following complementary manner: Karuna is the desire to remove harm and suffering (ahita-dukkha-apanaya-kāmatā) from others; while mettā is the desire to bring about the well-being and happiness (hita-sukha-upanaya-kāmatā) of others. The "far enemy" of karuṇā is cruelty, a mind-state in obvious opposition. The "near enemy" (quality which superficially resembles karuṇā but is in fact more subtly in opposition to it), is (sentimental) pity: here too one wants to remove suffering, but for a partly selfish (attached) reason hence not the pure motivation. In the Pāli Canon, Buddhas are also described as choosing to teach "out of compassion for beings."

=== Mahayana Buddhism ===
In Mahāyāna Buddhism, karuṇā is one of the two qualities, along with enlightened wisdom (Sanskrit: prajña), to be cultivated on the bodhisattva path. According to scholar Rupert Gethin, this elevation of karuṇā to the status of prajña is one of the distinguishing factors between the Theravāda arahant ideal and the Mahāyāna bodhisattva ideal:

For the Mahāyāna... the path to arhatship appears tainted with a residual selfishness since it lacks the motivation of the great compassion (mahākaruṇā) of the bodhisattva, and ultimately the only legitimate way of Buddhist practice is the bodhisattva path.

Throughout the Mahāyāna world, Avalokiteśvara (Sanskrit; Chinese: Guan Yin; Japanese: Kannon; Tibetan: Chenrezig) is a bodhisattva who embodies karuṇā.

In the Intermediate section of the Stages of Meditation by Kamalaśīla, he writes:

Moved by compassion[karunā], Bodhisattvas take the vow to liberate all sentient beings. Then by overcoming their self-centered outlook, they engage eagerly and continuously in the very difficult practices of accumulating merit and insight. Having entered into this practice, they will certainly complete the collection of merit and insight. Accomplishing the accumulation of merit and insight is like having omniscience itself in the palm of your hand. Therefore, since compassion is the only root of omniscience, you should become familiar with this practice from the very beginning.

In the eight section of the Bodhisattvacaryāvatāra by Shantideva, entitled Meditative Concentration, Shantideva describes the development of Karunā through the practice of equalizing oneself and others. He writes that "in joy and sorrow all are equal" and compares concern for others with care for the different parts of one's own body. He describes others' suffering as "mine and therefore hard to bear. And therefore I'll dispel the pain of others, for it is simply pain".

== Jainism ==
In Jainism, karuṇā (compassion) is one of the four reflections of universal friendship—along with amity (Sanskrit: maitri), appreciation (pramoda) and equanimity (madhyastha)—used to stop (samvara) the influx of karma.

== Miscellaneous ==
=== In literature ===
In Aldous Huxley's novel Island, the concept of "karuna" is central to the philosophical and spiritual ethos of the society depicted in the book. In the novel, mynah birds are trained to repeat "Karuna" at key moments, reminding the islanders to approach situations with understanding and empathy.

== See also ==
- Mudita – Sympathetic or vicarious joy in Sanskrit and Pali
- Life release – Buddhist practice
- Natyashastra – Sanskrit text on the performing arts (200 BCE to 200 AD)
- Ramayana – Ancient Sanskrit epic written by Valmiki

== Sources ==
- The Connected Discourses of the Buddha: A Translation of the Saṃyutta Nikāya. Translated by Bodhi, Bhikku. Boston: Wisdom Publications. 2000. ISBN 0-86171-331-1.
- "Unit 6: The Four Immeasurables". Buddhist Studies for Secondary Students. Buddha Dharma Education Association & BuddhaNet. Archived from the original on 2024-04-18.
- Buddhaghosa, Bhadantacariya (1999). The Path of Purification: Visuddhimagga. Translated by Ñāṇamoli, Bhikkhu. Seattle, Wash.: BPS Pariyatti Editions. ISBN 1-928706-00-2.
- Buddhagosha, Bhadantacariya (2010) [1956]. Vishudimagga (The Path of Purification) (PDF). Translated by Bhikkhu Ñãnamoli. Buddhist Publication Society. 2.99. ISBN 978-1928706014.
- Gethin, Rupert (1998). The Foundations of Buddhism. Oxford: Oxford University Press.
- Gyatso, Tenzin; Kamalashila (2019). Stages of Meditation. Translated by Geshe Lobsang Jordhen; Losang Choephel Ganchenpa; Jeremy Russell. Snow Lion Publications.
- Monier-Williams, Monier (1964) [1899]. A Sanskrit-English Dictionary. London: Oxford University Press. ISBN 0-19-864308-X.
- Rhys Davids, T.W.; Stede, William, eds. (1921–25). The Pali Text Society's Pali–English Dictionary. Chipstead: Pali Text Society.
- The Sutta-Nipāta. Translated by Saddhatissa, Hammalawa. New York: Curzon, London/Humanities Press. 2003 [1985].
- Salzberg, Sharon (1995). Lovingkindness: The Revolutionary Art of Happiness. Boston: Shambhala Publications. ISBN 1-57062-176-4.
- Shah, Pravin K. "Nine Tattvas (Principles)". Jainism Literature Center / Jain Education. Archived from the original on 2009-06-05.
- Shantideva (2011). The Way of the Bodhisattva (Bodhicharyavatara). Boston: Shambhala.
- "Kalama Sutta: To the Kalamas". Access to Insight. Translated by Thanissaro, Bhikku. 1994. (AN 3.65). Archived from the original on 2011-10-06.
- "Ayacana Sutta: The Request". Access to Insight. Translated by Thanissaro, Bhikku. 1997. (SN 6.1).
- "Metta Sutta: Good Will (1)". Access to Insight. Translated by Thanissaro, Bhikku. 2006. (AN 4.125).
- Warder, A. K. (2004) [1970]. Indian Buddhism. Delhi: Motilal Banarsidass. ISBN 81-208-1741-9.
