= Shri Madhavnath Maharaj =

- Shri Samaratha Yogabhyanand Madhavnath Maharaj
- Born: 26 March 1857; Paangari, Sinnar, Nashik, Maharashtra
- Other name: Madhavnath Ratnaparkhi

Shri Madhavnath Maharaj (1857–1936) was a Hindu saint of Karvi, Chitrakoot, Madhya Pradesh, who continued the Nath Sampradaya of the famous Navnaths in India.

== Early life ==
Yogabhyanand Shri Madhavnath Maharaj was born on Shak 1779 Chaitra Shukla Pratipada, (Thursday, 26 March 1857) in Deshastha Yajurvedi Brahmin family of Shrimati Mathurabai and Shri Malhardada Ratnaparkhi (Kulkarni) in Paangari, a village in Sinnar Taluka, District Nashik.

== Siddhi ==
Shri Madhavnath Maharaj attained liberation in the Balaji temple containing Shri's samadhi. Guptanath. After that, Shri Madhavnath Maharaj, when he was thirteen years old, went on a journey that would take him to Badri-Kedar, Rameshwaram, the twelve jyotirlingas and the samadhi sthaan of the Nava Natha's (nine masters). He followed a solitary strict penance for another six years in the Himalayas and attained yogasiddhi. Shri Madhavnath Maharaj then went to Kashi, Trimbakeshwar, Nasik, Jalgaon, Manala, Amarkantak, Indore, Ujjain, Gwalior, Khaandwa, Chaalisgaon, Saptashrungi, and many other places where he blessed people and helped them lead a spiritual life. As a result, a vast shishya parampara was established which continues to grow to this day.

== Work and social influence ==
Shri Madhavnath Maharaj spread the importance of Yoga and Naamasmaran throughout India. He blessed his followers to build the Lakshmi-venkatesh temple at Rangaari, Devgaon in Aurangabad district. Shreenath temple was then built at Thorgavhaan in Jalgaon, with the help of Lakhsmibai halwai Shri Madhavnath Maharaj built the famous Dagdusheth Halwai Datta Mandir in Budhwaar Peth, Pune. Several temples were built in Indore, Trimbakeshwar in Nashik, Akola, Nagpur, Wardha, Hinganghat, Dhaar, Shiraale, Nandgaon, Kashi and other places which helped people attain the spiritual path. Madhav Nath Maharaj's spiritual lineage was carried forward by Shri Yogabhyānand Vyankat Nath Maharaj of Devgaon (Aurangabad). Since 1993, Shri Adhyatma Yogmaharshi Narendra Nath Maharaj has continued this tradition in accordance with the direct instructions of his guru, Shri Vyankat Nath Maharaj.
