= Samarasa =

Sanskrit term meaning 'one taste'

Samarasa (Sanskrit Devanagari: समरास; IAST: samarāsa; synonymous with IAST: ekarāsa; Tibetan: རོ་གཅིག, Wylie: ro gcig; Tibetan: རོ་མཉམ, Wylie: ro mnyam) is literally "one-taste" "one-flavour" or "same-taste" and means equipoise in feelings, non-discriminating or the mind at rest.

== In Buddhism ==
Nalanda Translation Committee (1982: p. 223) render a work on Marpa, the famed Tibetan Yogi and define samarasa as:

...equal taste (S: samarasa; T: ro-mnyam) The yogic practices and visualization exercises of Buddhist tantra are extremely complex, but underlying them is a single experience of things as they are. This realization or state of mind is sometimes called equal taste, meaning that all extremes of good and bad, awake and sleep, and so on have the same fundamental nature of emptiness and mind itself.

=== Dzogchen ===
Vajranatha (1996: p. 332) in his glossary of The Golden Letters, an annexure to his translation of, and commentary upon, the 'Three Statements' (Wylie: tshig gsum gnad brdeg) of Garab Dorje, defines thus:

- ro-gcig: single taste, single flavour, the state of being a single taste, ekarasa
- ro-snyoms: same taste, the process of making everything into the same taste, samarasa

== In Hinduism ==
Samarasa is one of four principal keywords and teachings of the Natha Tradition, the other three being 'svecchachara' (Sanskrit: स्वेच्छाचार), 'sama' (Sanskrit: सम), and 'sahaja' (Sanskrit: सहज).

Shri Gurudev Mahendranath (1911 - 1991), founder of the International Nath Order, wrote:

This unique word, completely absent from Vedic texts, is found again and again in Tantra, Upanishads, and all the best of non-Vedic literature. In one short chapter of the Avadhuta Gita, it occurs more than forty times. This whole Gita would be impossible to read and understand without the knowledge of this word.

The Tantrik or non-Vedic teachers used the word Samarasa in its mundane meaning to suggest higher truth. Samarasa can mean the ecstasy attained in sexual intercourse at the moment of orgasm. Using this, as they did of many other worldly things—to draw an analog between the moment of sexual bliss and the spiritual bliss of realization—men and women, it was thought, would understand absolute concepts better from the examples of relative life.

Going higher, it means the essential unity of all things—of all existence, the equipoise of equanimity, the supreme bliss of harmony, that which is aesthetically balanced, undifferentiated unity, absolute assimilation, the most perfect unification, and the highest consummation of Oneness.

To Dattatreya, it meant a stage of realization of the Absolute Truth, where there was no longer any distinction to be felt, seen or experienced between the seeker and the sought. Gorakshanath, who wrote the first texts of the Nathas, explains Samarasa as a state of absolute freedom, peace, and attainment in the realization of the Absolute Truth. He placed it on a higher level than samadhi.

Samarasa implied the joy and happiness with perfect equanimity and tranquility, maintained after samadhi had finished, and continued in the waking or conscious state. In this sense, it is a form of permanent ecstasy and contemplation which the saint maintains at all times.
