= Avadhuta Gita =

Sanskrit text of Hinduism

Avadhuta Gita (Devanagari: अवधूत गीता, IAST: Avadhūta Gītā) is a Sanskrit text of Hinduism whose title means "Song of the free soul". The text's poetry is based on the principles of Advaita and Dvaita schools of Hindu philosophy.

The text is attributed to Dattatreya, and extant manuscripts have been dated to approximately the 9th or 10th century CE. It consists of 289 shlokas (metered verses), divided into eight chapters. The first seven chapters are the text's oldest layer, and the eighth chapter is likely a later interpolation. It may have been composed in the deccan states of India, probably Maharashtra. Avadhuta Gita has been one of the most important texts of the Natha Yogi tradition of Hinduism.

== Date ==
Abhayananda states, "The actual date of authorship of the Avadhut Gita is unknown, but, judging by its terminology and style, it appears to have been written, not in the millennia prior to the Current Era, as legend would have it, but sometime around the 9th or 10th centuries of our Current Era. This does not, of course, preclude the possibility of an oral transmission to that point in time."

== Name ==
The title of the text, Avadhuta means "liberated soul", while Gita means song. The text describes the nature and the state of a person who is spiritually free and liberated.

The text is also known as Avadhuta Grantha, Dattatreya Gita, Datta Gita Yoga Shastra and Vedanta Sara.

== Contents ==
Shiva is the soul within

I am thus the pure Shiva,
devoid of all doubt.
O beloved friend,
how shall I bow to my own Self,
in my Self?

— Avadhuta Gita 3.2
Transl: Antonio Rigopoulos

The Avadhuta Gita is structured in 8 chapters, wherein Dattatreya—the symbol of the highest yogi and monastic life—describes as the divine master and example, the journey of self-realization, thereafter the nature and state of a person who lives in his soul's truth.

Dattatreya asserts in the text, that the self-realized person is "by nature, the formless, all pervasive Self". He is in the state of sama-rasya or samata, which is where there are no differences between anything or anyone, neither one own's body or another person's, neither class nor gender, neither human being nor other living beings, between the abstract and the empirical universe, all is one interconnected reality, it is the unification of the One and the Beyond. His universe, all of the universe, is within his Atman (soul). "There is never any you and I", states verse 6.22.

The chapters discuss 'contemplation', states Rigopoulos, as well as "sahaja amṛitam" 'nectar of naturalness'. Some of its teachings have been compared to the Bhagavad Gita. The term Sahaja, that became important in both Hindu and Buddhist tantric traditions, means "transcendent Reality, or Absolute". It is equated to Sunya (void) in Buddhism, envisioned as a kind of "unlocated paradise", states Rigopoulos. In Hinduism, it is the interior Guru within the person, the Sadashiva, the all pervading ultimate Reality (Brahman) that is the Atman (Self) within.

== Translation ==
- The Brahmavadin journal published an English translation of the separate chapters of the Avadhuta Gita in Volumes 9 through 11, in early 20th century.
- The brief introduction with attendant English translation of the Avadhuta Gita by Ashokananda (1893–1969) is reproduced in Katz.
- Alexandra David-Néel, translated the text from Sanskrit into French, title Avadhuta Gîtâ, 1958.

== Reception ==
The text has been influential on the Nath tradition of Hinduism, states Rigopoulos, and its teachings form a foundation of their Sama-rasya doctrine:

The transcendental reality is revealed [by Avadhuta Gita] as the Universe. In other words, the difference between what is Formless and what has Form disappears forever, and it is co-eternal with the vision of the Universe in Atman.

— Gopinath Kaviraj, Quoted by Antonio Rigopoulos

Passages of the text are found in numerous Hindu texts, such as in the widely translated Bhagavata Purana, which is the most popular Purana, where verses 8.2 to 8.4 of Avadhuta Gita appear as verses 11.11.29-11.11.31 as one example. The text's nirguni Brahman ideas influenced the poetry of Kabir, states Rigopoulos.

Vivekananda (1863–1902) held the Avadhuta Gita in esteem and he translated aspects of it in the following talk he gave on July 28, 1895, transcribed by his disciple Waldo:

"He who has filled the universe, He who is Self in self, how shall I salute Him!" To know the Atman as my nature is both knowledge and realisation. "I am He, there is not the least doubt of it." "No thought, no word, no deed, creates a bondage for me. I am beyond the senses, I am knowledge and bliss." There is neither existence nor non-existence, all is Atman. Shake off all ideas of relativity; shake off all superstitions; let caste and birth and Devas and all else vanish. Why talk of being and becoming? Give up talking of dualism and Advaitism! When were you two, that you talk of two or one? The universe is this Holy One and He alone. Talk not of Yoga to make you pure; you are pure by your very nature. None can teach you.

== See also ==
- Bhagavad Gita
- Ashtavakra Gita
- Bhagavata Purana
- The Ganesha Gita
- Puranas
- Self-consciousness (Vedanta)
- Uddhava Gita
- Vedas
- Prasthanatrayi
- Vyadha Gita
