= Samadhi =

State of meditative consciousness

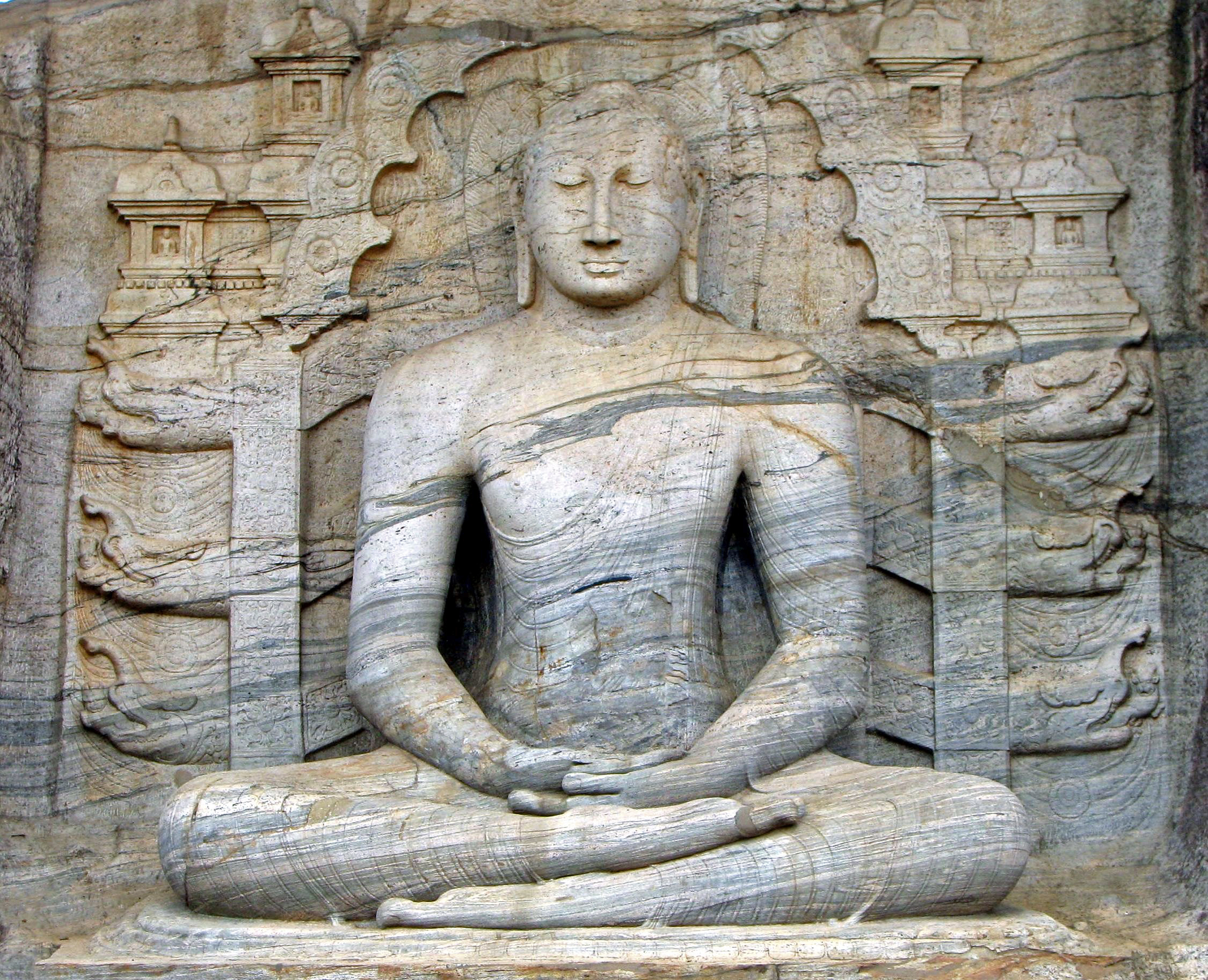
An image of the Buddha in samadhi from Gal Vihara, Sri Lanka

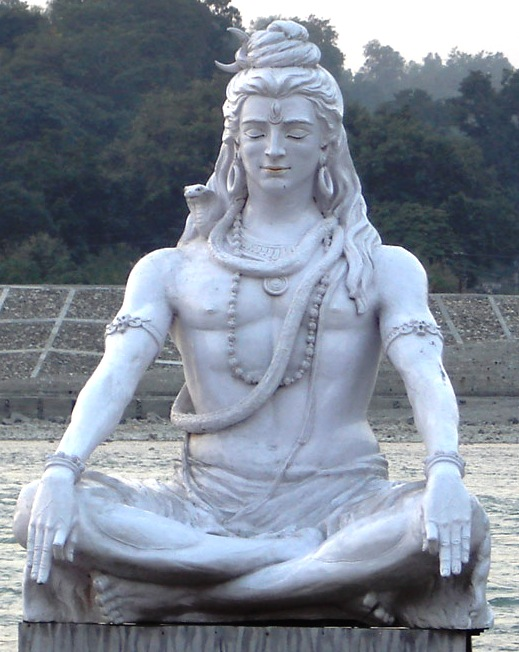
Statue of a meditating Shiva, Rishikesh

Samādhi (Pali and Sanskrit: समाधि), in the Indian religions, is a state of meditative consciousness. In many such traditions, the cultivation of samādhi through various meditation methods is essential for the attainment of liberation (nirvana, moksha) from the bondage to habitual desires, thought constructs, and unguarded behavioral patterns (fetters, samskaras), and the recognition of this liberated state as one's natural state or true 'self'.

In Buddhism, it is the last of the eight elements of the Noble Eightfold Path. (Note: accesstoinsight, Right Concentration, samma samadhi) In the Ashtanga Yoga tradition, it is the eighth and final limb identified in the Yoga Sutras of Patanjali. In Jain meditation, samadhi is considered one of the last stages of the practice just prior to liberation.

In the oldest Buddhist sutras, on which several contemporary western Theravada teachers rely, it refers to the development of an investigative and luminous mind that is equanimous and mindful. In the yogic traditions and the Buddhist commentarial tradition, on which the Burmese Vipassana movement and the Thai Forest tradition rely, it is interpreted as a meditative absorption or trance attained by the practice of dhyāna.

== Definitions ==
Samadhi may refer to a broad range of states. A common understanding regards samadhi as meditative absorption:

- Sarbacker: samādhi is meditative absorption or contemplation.
- Diener, Erhard & Fischer-Schreiber: samādhi is a non-dualistic state of consciousness in which the consciousness of the experiencing subject becomes one with the observing object.
- Shivananda: "When the mind is completely absorbed in one object of meditation, it is termed Samadhi." (Note: Shivananda: "In Samadhi, There is neither physical nor mental consciousness. There is only spiritual consciousness. There is only Existence (Sat). That is your real Svarupa. When the water dries up in a pool, the reflection of the sun in the water also vanishes. When the mind melts in Brahman, when the mind-lake dries up, the reflected Chaitanya (Chidabhasa) also vanishes. The Jivatman (personality) goes away. There remains Existence alone.")

In a Buddhist context, samadhi is a state of intensified awareness and focus:

- Dogen: "The Buddha says: 'When you monks unify your minds, the mind is in samadhi. Since the mind is in samadhi, you know the characteristics of the creation and destruction of the various phenomena in the world [...] When you gain samadhi, the mind is not scattered, just as those who protect themselves from floods guard the levee.'"
- Richard Shankman: "The term samadhi basically means 'undistractedness.'" It may be viewed as "an exclusive focus on a single object," but also as "a broader state of awareness in which the mind remains steady and unmoving, yet aware of a wide range of phenomena around the meditation object." According to Shankman, the related term cittas'ekaggata may be rendered as "one-pointedness," fixated on a single object, but also as "unification of mind," in which mind becomes very still but does not merge with the object of attention, and is thus able to observe and gain insight into the changing flow of experience.
- Dan Lusthaus: "Samadhi provides the methodology and context within which experience is to be examined [...] Samadhi, by training, focusing/collecting, cleansing and calming the mind [...] facilitates things being finally known (janatti) and seen (passati) just as they are (tathata).
- Keren Arbel: "Samadhi is depicted [in the Buddhist sutras] as a broad field of awareness, knowing but non-discursive [...] a stable, discerning and focused mind."
- Tilmann Vetter argues that the second, third and fourth dhyana in Buddhism, samma-samadhi, "right samadhi," build on a "spontaneous awareness" (sati) and equanimity which is perfected in the fourth dhyana.

In Hinduism, samadhi is also interpreted as the identification with the Absolute:

- Paramahansa Yogananda: A soundless state of breathlessness. A blissful super consciousness state in which a yogi perceives the identity of the individualized Soul and Cosmic Spirit.

== Etymology ==
=== Sanskrit ===
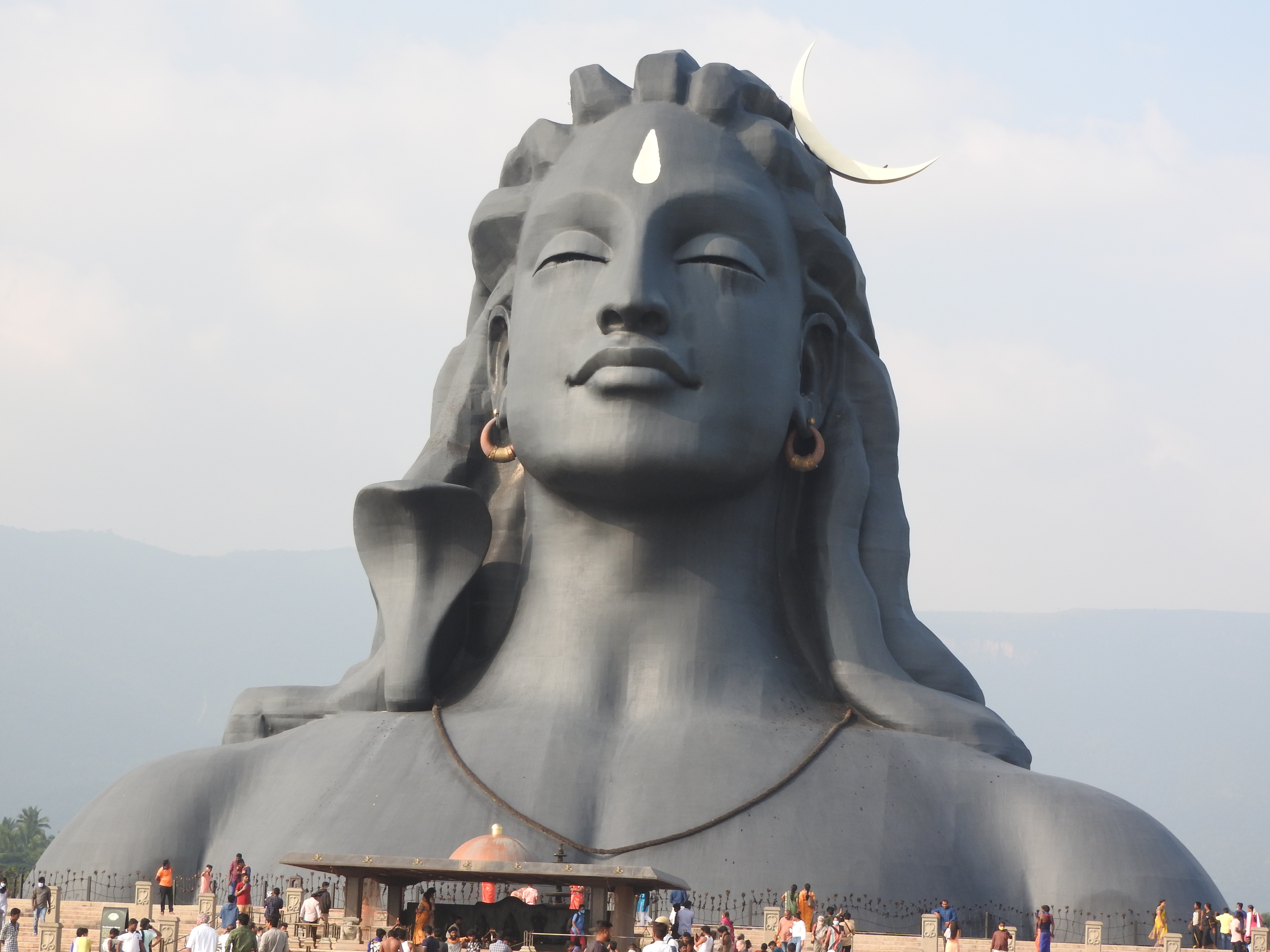
Statue of Shiva in meditation, Coimbatore

Various interpretations for the term's etymology are possible, either with the root sam ("to bring together") or sama ( "the same, equalized, the convergence of two distinct things"). According to Dan Lusthaus, samadhi refers to either bringing to consciousness the samskaras ("buried latencies"), or meditative concentration on a meditation object:

- sam, "to bring together"; adhi, "to place on, put, to impregnate, to give, to receive": the bringing together of cognitive conditions," "bringing the buried latencies or samskaras into full view," so "the obscure and hidden become clear objects of cognition," "the womb through which insight is born."
- sama, "the same, equalized, the convergence of two distinct things based on some commonality"; adhi, "higher, better, most skilfully achieved": "the skillful unification of mind and object," "the mental equanimity conducive to and derived from attention perfectly focused on its object." "[S]ometimes treated as synonymous with ekacitta, 'one-focused mind,' i.e. mind (citta) completely focused on and at one (eka) with its object."

Etymologies for sam-ā-dhā include:

- sam-ā-dhā': "'to collect' or 'to bring together', thus suggesting the concentration or unification of the mind"; generally translated [in Buddhism] as "concentration."
- sam-ā-dhā: "to hold together, to concentrate upon."
- sam, "completely"; ā, "the return towards the subject"; dha, "maintaining together: "to assemble completely"; "the tension borne between two poles of existence (object and thought) is reduced to zero."
- sam, "together" or "integrated"; ā, "towards"; dhā, "to get, to hold": to acquire integration or wholeness, or truth (samāpatti);
- sam, "together"; ā, "toward"; stem of dadhati, "puts, places": a putting or joining;

Particular Hindu/yoga interpretations include:

- sam, "perfect" or "complete"; dhi, "consciousness": "all distinctions between the person who is the subjective meditator, the act of meditation and the object of meditation merge into oneness" (Stephen Sturgess);
- sam, "with"; ādhi, "Lord": Union with the Lord (Stephen Sturgess);

=== Chinese ===
Common Chinese terms for samādhi include the transliterations sanmei (三昧) and sanmodi (三摩地; 三摩提), as well as the translation of the term literally as ding (定; "stability"). Kumarajiva's translations typically use sanmei (三昧), while the translations of Xuanzang tend to use ding (定; "stability"). The Chinese Buddhist canon includes these, as well as other translations and transliterations of the term.

== Buddhism ==
Translations of samādhi
- English: concentration; meditative consciousness; 'bringing together'
- Sanskrit: समाधि (IAST: samādhi)
- Pali: samādhi
- Burmese: သမာဓိ (MLCTS: samardhi)
- Chinese: 三昧 or 三摩地 or 定 (Pinyin: sānmèi or sānmóde or dìng)
- Japanese: 三昧 (Rōmaji: sanmai)
- Khmer: សមាធិ (UNGEGN: sâméathĭ)
- Korean: 삼매 (RR: sammae)
- Tibetan: ཏིང་ངེ་འཛིན་ (Wylie: ting nge 'dzin)
- Thai: สมาธิ (RTGS: samathi)
- Vietnamese: định (Chữ Nôm: 定)

=== Samma-samādhi and dhyāna (jhāna) ===
Uses of samādhi (based on AN IV.41)
object of concentration	development
four jhānas	pleasant abiding (sukha-vihārāya) in this life (diţţhadhamma)
perception (sañña) of light (āloka)	knowing (ñāṇa) and seeing (dassana)
arising, passing, fading of feelings (vedanā), perceptions (saññā) and thoughts (vitakkā)	mindfulness (sati) and clear comprehension (sampajaññā)
arising and fading of the five aggregates of clinging (pañc'upādāna-khandha)	extinction (khaya) of the taints (āsava) [Arahantship]

Samma-samadhi, "right samadhi," is the last of the eight elements of the Noble Eightfold Path. When samadhi is developed, things are understood as they really are.

Samma-samadhi is explicated as dhyana (jhāna, Pali: 𑀛𑀸𑀦), which is traditionally interpreted as one-pointed concentration. Yet, in the stock formula of dhyāna samādhi is only mentioned in the second dhyana, to give way to a state of equanimity and mindfulness, in which one keeps access to the senses in a mindful way, avoiding primary responses to the sense-impressions.

The origins of the practice of dhyāna are a matter of dispute. According to Crangle, the development of meditative practices in ancient India was a complex interplay between Vedic and non-Vedic traditions. According to Bronkhorst, the four rūpa jhāna may be an original contribution of the Buddha to the religious landscape of India, which formed an alternative to the painful ascetic practices of the Jains, while the arūpa jhāna were incorporated from non-Buddhist ascetic traditions. Alexander Wynne argues that dhyāna was incorporated from Brahmanical practices, in the Nikayas ascribed to Alara Kalama and Uddaka Ramaputta. These practices were paired to mindfulness and insight, and given a new interpretation. Kalupahana also argues that the Buddha "reverted to the meditational practices" he had learned from Alara Kalama and Uddaka Ramaputta.

=== The rupa jhānas ===
Table: Factors of rūpa jhāna
Cetasika (mental factors)	First jhāna	Second jhāna	Third jhāna	Fourth jhāna
Kāma / Akusala dhamma (sensuality / unskillful qualities)	secluded from; withdrawn	does not occur	does not occur	does not occur
Pīti (rapture)	seclusion-born; pervades body	samādhi-born; pervades body	fades away (along with distress)	does not occur
Sukha (non-sensual pleasure)	seclusion-born; pervades body	samādhi-born; pervades body	pervades physical body	abandoned (no pleasure nor pain)
Vitakka ("applied thought")	accompanies jhāna	unification of awareness free from vitakka and vicāra	does not occur	does not occur
Vicāra ("sustained thought")	accompanies jhāna	unification of awareness free from vitakka and vicāra	does not occur	does not occur
Upekkhāsatipārisuddhi (pure, mindful equanimity)	does not occur	internal confidence	equanimous; mindful	purity of equanimity and mindfulness

In the sutras, jhāna is entered when one 'sits down cross-legged and establishes mindfulness'. According to Buddhist tradition, it may be supported by ānāpānasati, mindfulness of breathing, a core meditative practice which can be found in almost all schools of Buddhism. The Suttapiṭaka and the Agamas describe four stages of rūpa jhāna. Rūpa refers to the material realm, in a neutral stance, as different from the kāma-realm (lust, desire) and the arūpa-realm (non-material realm). While interpreted in the Theravada-tradition as describing a deepening concentration and one-pointedness, originally the jhānas seem to describe a development from investigating body and mind and abandoning unwholesome states, to perfected equanimity and watchfulness, an understanding which is retained in Zen and Dzogchen. The stock description of the jhānas, with traditional and alternative interpretations, is as follows: (Note: Keren Arbel refers to Majjhima Nikaya 26, Ariyapariyesana Sutta, The Noble Search See also: * Majjhima Nikaya 111, Anuppada Sutta * AN 05.028, Samadhanga Sutta: The Factors of Concentration. See Johansson (1981), Pali Buddhist texts Explained to Beginners for a word-by-word translation.)

1. First jhāna:
  Separated (vivicceva) from desire for sensual pleasures, separated (vivicca) from [other] unwholesome states (akusalehi dhammehi, unwholesome dhammas), a bhikkhu enters upon and abides in the first jhana, which is [mental] pīti ("rapture," "joy") and [bodily] sukha ("pleasure"; also: 'lasting', in contrast to 'transient' (dukkha)) "born of viveka" (traditionally, "seclusion"; alternatively, "discrimination" (of dhamma's) (Note: Arbel explains that "viveka" is usually translated as "detachment," "separation," or "seclusion," but the primary meaning is "discrimination." According to Arbel, the usage of vivicca/vivicceva and viveka in the description of the first dhyana "plays with both meanings of the verb; namely, its meaning as discernment and the consequent 'seclusion' and letting go," in line with the "discernment of the nature of experience" developed by the four satipatthanas. Compare Dogen: "Being apart from all disturbances and dwelling alone in a quiet place is called "enjoying serenity and tranquility."" Arbel further argues that viveka resembles dhamma vicaya, which is mentioned in the bojjhanga, an alternative description of the dhyanas, but the only bojjhanga-term not mentioned in the stock dhyana-description. Compare Sutta Nipatha 5.14 Udayamāṇavapucchā (The Questions of Udaya): "Pure equanimity and mindfulness, preceded by investigation of principles—this, I declare, is liberation by enlightenment, the smashing of ignorance.” (Translation: Sujato))), accompanied by vitarka-vicara (traditionally, initial and sustained attention to a meditative object; alternatively, initial inquiry and subsequent investigation of dhammas (defilements and wholesome thoughts (Note: Stta Nipatha 5:13 Udaya’s Questions (transl. Thanissaro): "With delight the world’s fettered. With directed thought it’s examined." Chen 2017: "Samadhi with general examination and specific in-depth investigation means getting rid of the not virtuous dharmas, such as greedy desire and hatred, to stay in joy and pleasure caused by nonarising, and to enter the first meditation and fully dwell in it." Arbel 2016, p. 73: "Thus, my suggestion is that we should interpret the existence of vitakka and vicara in the first jhana as wholesome 'residues' of a previous development of wholesome thoughts. They denote the 'echo' of these wholesome thoughts, which reverberates in one who enters the first jhana as wholesome attitudes toward what is experienced.")); also: "discursive thought" (Note: In the Pali canon, Vitakka-vicāra form one expression, which refers to directing one's thought or attention on an object (vitarka) and investigate it (vicāra). According to Dan Lusthaus, vitarka-vicāra is analytic scrutiny, a form of prajna. It "involves focusing on [something] and then breaking it down into its functional components" to understand it, "distinguishing the multitude of conditioning factors implicated in a phenomenal event." The Theravada commentarial tradition, as represented by Buddhaghosa's Visuddhimagga, interprets vitarka and vicāra as the initial and sustained application of attention to a meditational object, which culminates in the stilling of the mind when moving on to the second dhyana. According to Martin Stuart-Fox and Rod Bucknell it may also refer to "the normal process of discursive thought," which is quieted through absorption in the second jhāna.)).
2. Second jhāna:
  Again, with the stilling of vitarka-vicara, a bhikkhu enters upon and abides in the second jhana, which is [mental] pīti and [bodily] sukha "born of samadhi" (samadhi-ji; trad. born of "concentration"; altern. "knowing but non-discursive [...] awareness," "bringing the buried latencies or samskaras into full view" (Note: The standard translation for samadhi is "concentration"; yet, this translation/interpretation is based on commentarial interpretations, as explained by a number of contemporary authors. Tilmann Vetter notes that samadhi has a broad range of meanings, and "concentration" is just one of them. Vetter argues that the second, third and fourth dhyana are samma-samadhi, "right samadhi," building on a "spontaneous awareness" (sati) and equanimity which is perfected in the fourth dhyana.)), and has sampasadana ("stillness," "inner tranquility" (Note: The common translation, based on the commentarial interpretation of dhyana as expanding states of absorption, translates sampasadana as "internal assurance." Yet, as Bucknell explains, it also means "tranquilizing," which is more apt in this context. See also Passaddhi.)) and ekaggata (unification of mind, awareness) without vitarka-vicara;
3. Third jhāna:
  With the fading away of pīti, a bhikkhu abides in upekkhā (equanimity," "affective detachment" (Note: Upekkhā is one of the Brahmaviharas.)), sato (mindful) and [with] sampajañña ("fully knowing," "discerning awareness"). [Still] experiencing sukha with the body, he enters upon and abides in the third jhana, on account of which the noble ones announce, "abiding in [bodily] pleasure, one is equanimous and mindful".
4. Fourth jhāna:
  With the abandoning of [the desire for] sukha ("pleasure") and [aversion to] dukkha ("pain") and with the previous disappearance of [the inner movement between] somanassa ("gladness,") and domanassa ("discontent"), a bhikkhu enters upon and abides in the fourth jhana, which is adukkham asukham ("neither-painful-nor-pleasurable," "freedom from pleasure and pain") and has upekkhā-sati-parisuddhi (complete purity of equanimity and mindfulness). (Note: With the fourth jhāna comes the attainment of higher knowledge (abhijñā), that is, the extinction of all mental intoxicants (āsava), but also psychic powers. For instance in AN 5.28, the Buddha states (Thanissaro, 1997.): "When a monk has developed and pursued the five-factored noble right concentration in this way, then whichever of the six higher knowledges he turns his mind to know and realize, he can witness them for himself whenever there is an opening...." "If he wants, he wields manifold supranormal powers. Having been one he becomes many; having been many he becomes one. He appears. He vanishes. He goes unimpeded through walls, ramparts, and mountains as if through space. He dives in and out of the earth as if it were water. He walks on water without sinking as if it were dry land. Sitting crosslegged he flies through the air like a winged bird. With his hand he touches and strokes even the sun and moon, so mighty and powerful. He exercises influence with his body even as far as the Brahma worlds. He can witness this for himself whenever there is an opening ...")

=== The arupas ===
Appended to the jhana-scheme are four meditative states, referred to in the early texts as arupas or as āyatana. They are sometimes mentioned in sequence after the first four jhānas and thus came to be treated by later exegetes as jhānas. The immaterial are related to, or derived from, yogic meditation, and aim more specific at concentration, while the jhanas proper are related to the cultivation of the mind. The state of complete dwelling in emptiness is reached when the eighth jhāna is transcended. The four arupas are:

- fifth jhāna: infinite space (Pali ākāsānañcāyatana, Skt. ākāśānantyāyatana),
- sixth jhāna: infinite consciousness (Pali viññāṇañcāyatana, Skt. vijñānānantyāyatana),
- seventh jhāna: infinite nothingness (Pali ākiñcaññāyatana, Skt. ākiṃcanyāyatana),
- eighth jhāna: neither perception nor non-perception (Pali nevasaññānāsaññāyatana, Skt. naivasaṃjñānāsaṃjñāyatana).

Although the "Dimension of Nothingness" and the "Dimension of Neither Perception nor Non-Perception" are included in the list of nine jhanas attributed to the Buddha, they are not included in the Noble Eightfold Path. Noble Path number eight is "Samma Samadhi" (Right Concentration), and only the first four Jhanas are considered "Right Concentration". When all the jhanas are mentioned, the emphasis is on the "Cessation of Feelings and Perceptions" rather than stopping short at the "Dimension of Neither Perception nor Non-Perception".

=== Theravāda ===
==== Samadhi as concentration ====
According to Gunaratana, the term 'samādhi' derives from the roots 'sam-ā-dhā', which means 'to collect' or 'bring together', and thus it is generally translated as "concentration." In the early Buddhist texts, samādhi is also associated with the term samatha (calm abiding). In the commentarial tradition, samādhi is defined as ekaggata, one-pointedness of mind (Cittass'ekaggatā).

Buddhagosa defines samādhi as "the centering of consciousness and consciousness concomitants evenly and rightly on a single object [...] the state in virtue of which consciousness and its concomitants remain evenly and rightly on a single object, undistracted and unscattered". According to Buddhaghosa, the Theravada Pali texts mention four attainments of samādhi:

1. Momentary concentration (khanikasamādhi): a mental stabilization which arises during samatha meditation.
2. Preliminary concentration (parikammasamādhi): arises out of the meditator's initial attempts to focus on a meditation object.
3. Access concentration (upacārasamādhi): arises when the five hindrances are dispelled, when jhāna is present, and with the appearance the 'counterpart sign' (patibhaganimitta).
4. Absorption concentration (appanasamādhi): the total immersion of the mind on its meditation of object and stabilization of all four jhānas.

Still according to Buddhaghosa, in his influential standard-work Visuddhimagga, samādhi is the "proximate cause" to the obtainment of wisdom. The Visuddhimagga describes 40 different objects for meditation, which are merely mentioned throughout the Pali canon, such as mindfulness of breathing (ānāpānasati) and loving kindness (mettā).

==== Criticism ====
While the Theravada tradition interprets dhyana as one-pointed concentration, this interpretation has become a matter of debate. According to Richard Gombrich, the sequence of the four rupa-jhanas describes two different cognitive states: "I know this is controversial, but it seems to me that the third and fourth jhanas are thus quite unlike the second." (Note: Original publication: Gombrich, Richard (2007), Religious Experience in Early Buddhism, OCHS Library, archived from the original on 2016-07-01)

Alexander Wynne states that the dhyana-scheme is poorly understood. According to Wynne, words expressing the inculcation of awareness, such as sati, sampajāno, and upekkhā, are mistranslated or understood as particular factors of meditative states, whereas they refer to a particular way of perceiving the sense objects. (Note: Wynne: "Thus the expression sato sampajāno in the third jhāna must denote a state of awareness different from the meditative absorption of the second jhāna (cetaso ekodibhāva). It suggests that the subject is doing something different from remaining in a meditative state, i.e. that he has come out of his absorption and is now once again aware of objects. The same is true of the word upek(k)hā: it does not denote an abstract 'equanimity', [but] it means to be aware of something and indifferent to it [...] The third and fourth jhāna-s, as it seems to me, describe the process of directing states of meditative absorption towards the mindful awareness of objects.) (Note: theravadin.wordpress.com: "In this order, therefore, what we should understand as vipassanā is not at all a synonym for sati but rather something which grows out of the combination of all these factors especially of course the last two, samma sati and samma samādhi applied to the ruthless observation of what comes into being (yathābhūta). One could say, vipassanā is a name for the practice of sati+samādhi as applied to anicca/dukkha/anatta (i.e. generating wisdom) directed at the six-sense-process, including any mental activity." According to Gombrich, "the later tradition has falsified the jhana by classifying them as the quintessence of the concentrated, calming kind of meditation, ignoring the other - and indeed higher - element.)

Several western teachers (Thanissaro Bhikkhu, Leigh Brazington, Richard Shankman) make a distinction between 'sutta-oriented' jhana and 'Visuddhimagga-oriented' jhāna. Thanissaro Bhikkhu has repeatedly argued that the Pali Canon and the Visuddhimagga give different descriptions of the jhanas, regarding the Visuddhimagga-description to be incorrect. Keren Arbel has conducted extensive research on the jhānas and the contemporary criticisms of the commentarial interpretation. Based on this research, and her own experience as a senior meditation-teacher, she gives a reconstructed account of the original meaning of the dhyanas. She argues that the four jhānas are the outcome of both calming the mind and developing insight into the nature of experience and cannot not be seen in the suttas as two distinct and separated meditation techniques, but as integral dimensions of a single process that leads to awakening. She concludes that "the fourth jhāna is the optimal experiential event for the utter de-conditioning of unwholesome tendencies of mind and for the transformation of deep epistemological structures. This is because one embodies and actualizes an awakened awareness of experience."

=== Mahāyāna ===
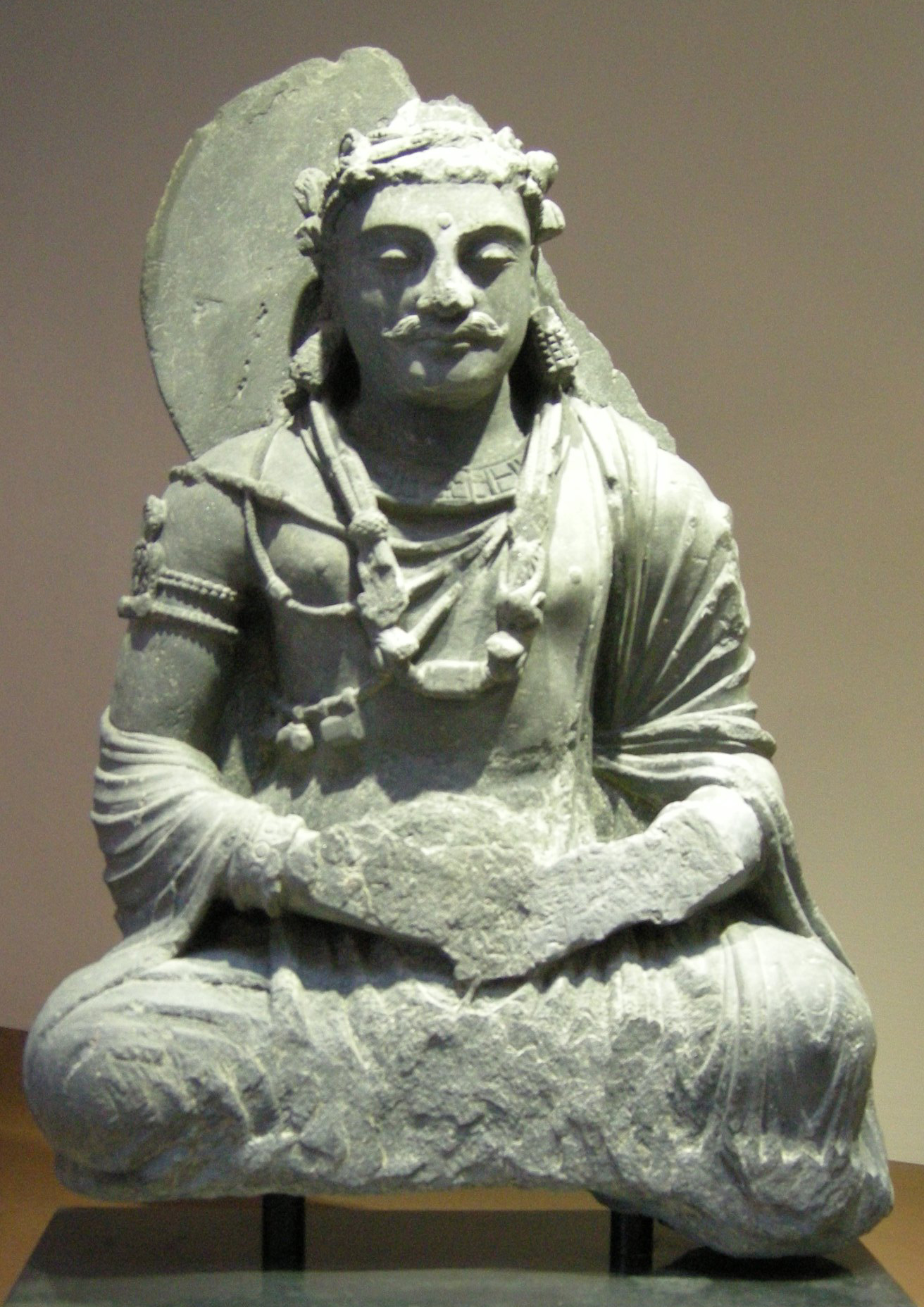
Bodhisattva seated in meditation. Afghanistan, 2nd century CE.

==== Indian Mahāyāna ====
The earliest extant Indian Mahāyāna texts emphasize ascetic practices, forest-dwelling, and states of meditative oneness, i.e. samādhi. These practices seem to have occupied a central place in early Mahāyāna, also because they "may have given access to fresh revelations and inspiration".

Indian Mahāyāna traditions refer to numerous forms of samādhi, for example, Section 21 of the Mahavyutpatti records 118 distinct forms of samādhi and the Samadhiraja Sutra has as its main theme a samādhi called 'the samādhi that is manifested as the sameness of the essential nature of all dharmas' (sarva-dharma-svabhavā-samatā-vipañcita-samādhi). (Note: Gomez & Silk: "This samādhi is at the same time the cognitive experience of emptiness, the attainment of the attributes of buddhahood, and the performance of a variety of practices or daily activities of a bodhisattva—including service and adoration at the feet of all buddhas. The word samādhi is also used to mean the sūtra itself. Consequently, we can speak of an equation, sūtra = samādhi = śūnyatā, underlying the text. In this sense, the title Samadhiraja expresses accurately the content of the sūtra".)

==== Vimokṣamukha ====
Buddhist Pali texts describe three kinds of samādhi which the commentarial tradition identify as the 'gates of liberation' (vimokṣamukha): (Note: Thich Nhat Hanh, Sherab Chodzin Kohn, Melvin McLeod (2012), You Are Here: Discovering the Magic of the Present Moment, p.104: "Aimlessness is a form of concentration, one of three practices of deep looking recommended by the Buddha. The other two are concentration on the absence of distinguishing signs (alakshana) and concentration on emptiness (sunyata).")

1. Signlessness-samadhi (Sa: ānimitta-samādhi) (Pi: animitto samādhi) or marklessness-concentration (Sa: alakṣaṇa-samādhi)
2. Aimlessness-samadhi (Sa: apraṇihita-samādhi) (Pi: appaṇihito samādhi)
3. Emptiness-samadhi (Sa: śūnyatā-samādhi) (Pi: suññato samādhi)

According to Polak, these are alternative descriptions of the four dhyanas, describing the cognitive aspects instead of the bodily aspects. According to Polak, in the final stages of dhyana no ideation of experience takes place, and no signs are grasped (animitta samādhi), which means that the concentrated attention cannot be directed (appaṇihita samādhi) towards those signs, and only the perception of the six senses remains, without a notion of "self" (suññata samādhi).

In the Chinese Buddhist tradition these are called the 'three doors of liberation' (sān jiětuō mén, 三解脫門): These three are not always cited in the same order. Nagarjuna, a Madhyamaka Buddhist scholar, in his Maha-prajnaparamita-sastra, listed apraṇihita before ānimitta in his first explanation on these "three samādhi", but in later listings and explanations in the same work reverted to the more common order. Others, such as Thích Nhất Hạnh, a Thien Buddhist teacher, list apraṇihita as the third after śūnyatā and ānimitta. Nagarjuna lists these three kinds of samādhi among the qualities of the bodhisattva.

===== Signlessness samādhi =====
According to Nagarjuna, signlessness-samadhi is the samādhi in which one recognises all dharmas are free of signs (ānimitta). According to Thích Nhất Hạnh, "signs" refer to appearances or form, likening signlessness samadhi to not being fooled by appearances, such as the dichotomy of being and non-being.

===== Aimlessness-samādhi =====
'Aimlessness', also translated as 'uncommittedness' or 'wishlessness' (Chinese wúyuàn 無願, lit. 'non-wishing', or wúzuò 無作, lit. 'non-arising'), literally means 'placing nothing in front'. According to Dan Lusthaus, aimlessness-samadhi is characterised by a lack of aims or plans for the future and no desire for the objects of perception. (Note: Lusthaus 2014, p. 266: "Sangharakshita translates apraṇihita as 'Aimlessness,' while Conze uses 'Wishless', and writes in Buddhist Thought in India (Ann Arbor: University of Michigan Press, 1967) p. 67: "The word a-pra-ni—hita means literally that one 'places nothing in front' and it designates someone who makes no plans for the future, has no hopes for it, who is aimless, not bent on anything, without predilection or desire for the objects of perception rejected by the concentration on the Signless [animitta].") According to Nagarjuna, aimlessness-samadhi is the samādhi in which one does not search for any kind of existence (bhāva), letting go of aims or wishes (praṇidhāna) regarding conditioned phenomena and not producing the three poisons (namely, passion, aggression, and ignorance) towards them in the future.

===== Emptiness-samādhi =====
According to Nagarjuna, emptiness-samadhi is the samādhi in which one recognises that the true natures of all dharmas are absolutely empty (atyantaśūnya), and that the five aggregates are not the self (anātman), do not belong to the self (anātmya), and are empty (śūnya) without self-nature.

==== Zen ====
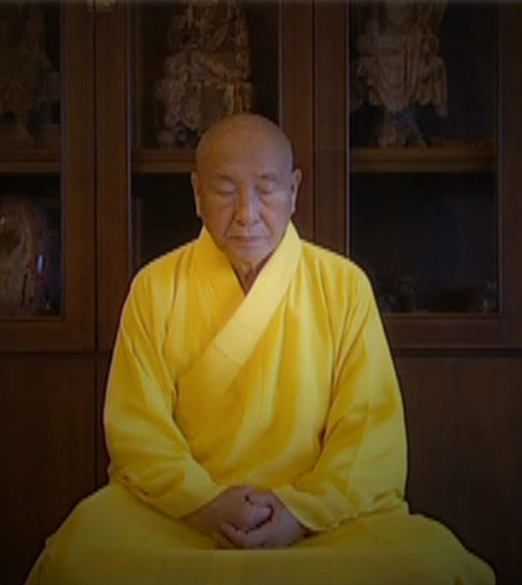
A traditional Chinese Chán Buddhist master in Taiwan, sitting in meditation

Indian dhyāna was translated as chán in Chinese, and zen in Japanese. Ideologically the Zen-tradition emphasizes prajñā and sudden insight, but in the actual practice prajñā and samādhi, or sudden insight and gradual cultivation, are paired to each other. Especially some lineages in the Rinzai school of Zen stress sudden insight, while the Sōtō school of Zen lays more emphasis on shikantaza, training awareness of the stream of thoughts, allowing them to arise and pass away without interference. Historically, many traditional Japanese arts were developed or refined to attain samādhi, including incense appreciation (香道, kodō), flower arranging (華道, kadō), the tea ceremony (茶道, sadō), calligraphy (書道, shodō), and martial arts such as archery (弓道, kyūdō). The Japanese character 道 means the way or the path and indicates that disciplined practice in the art is a path to samādhi.

== Hinduism ==
=== Patanjali's Yoga Sūtras ===
Samādhi is the eighth limb of the Yoga Sūtras, following the sixth and seventh limbs of dhāraṇā and dhyāna respectively.

==== Samyama ====
According to Taimni, dhāraṇā, dhyāna, and samādhi form a graded series:

1. Dhāraṇā ― In dhāraṇā, the mind learns to focus on a single object of thought. The object of focus is called a pratyaya. In dhāraṇā, the yogi learns to prevent other thoughts from intruding on focusing awareness on the pratyaya.
2. Dhyāna ― Over time and with practice, the yogin learns to sustain awareness of only the pratyaya, transforming dhāraṇā into dhyāna. In dhyāna, the yogin realizes the triplicity of perceiver (the yogin), perceived (the pratyaya), and the act of perceiving. The key distinction of dhyāna is the gradual minimization of the perceiver, leading to the fusion of the observer with the observed (the pratyaya).
3. Samādhi ― When the yogin sustains focus on the pratyaya and minimizes self-consciousness, dhyāna transforms into samādhi, where the yogin fuses with the pratyaya. Patanjali compares this to a transparent jewel on a coloured surface: the jewel takes on the colour of the surface. Similarly, in samādhi, the consciousness of the yogin fuses with the object of thought, the pratyaya. The pratyaya is like the coloured surface, and the yogin's consciousness is like the transparent jewel. (Note: Karambelkar: The description here of the "samadhi", which is the transformation and culmination of dhyana, is "arthamatra nirbhasam" and "svarupa-sunyam-iva". "Arthamatra nirbhasa" means clear perception of the mere essence behind the form having qualities of the subject, chosen for meditation. The second phrase "svarupa-sunyam-iva" amplifies further this meaning of the first phrase by saying that the "svarupa" i.e. the original form and appearance of the subject becomes almost extinct. Therefore, the subject is now perceived or experienced in its usual way that is experienced in our empirical life, but is experienced or comprehended or better still "realized" in its subtle essence or reality, which is lying behind it.)

==== Samādhi in the Yoga Sūtras ====
Samādhi is oneness with the object of meditation. There is no distinction between act of meditation and the object of meditation. Samādhi is of two kinds, with and without support of an object of meditation: (Note: Swami Jnaneshvara Bharati, Integrating 50+ Varieties of Yoga Meditation) (Note: Sri Swami Sivananda, Raja Yoga Samadhi)

- Samprajñata samādhi (also called savikalpa samādhi and sabija samādhi, (Note: Swami Sivananda, Samprajnata Samadhi) (Note: The seeds or samskaras are not destroyed.)) refers to samādhi with the support of an object of meditation. (Note: According to Jianxin Li Samprajnata Samadhi may be compared to the rupa jhānas of Buddhism. This interpretation may conflict with Gombrich and Wynne, according to whom the first and second jhāna represent concentration, whereas the third and fourth jhāna combine concentration with mindfulness. According to Eddie Crangle, the first jhāna resembles Patnajali's samprajñata samādhi, which both share the application of vitarka and vicara.) In Sutra 1:17 Patanjali tells us that samprajnata samādhi comprises four stages: "complete high consciousness (samprajnata samādhi) is that which is accompanied by vitarka (deliberation), vicara (reflection), ānanda (ecstasy), and asmitā (a sense of 'I'-ness)". (Note: Yoga Sutra 1.17: "Objective samādhi (samprajnata) is associated with deliberation, reflection, bliss, and I-am-ness (asmita).)

The first two, deliberation and reflection, form the basis of the various types of samāpatti:
- Savitarka, "deliberative": (Note: Yoga Sutra 1.42: "Deliberative (savitarka) samāpatti is that samādhi in which words, objects, and knowledge are commingled through conceptualization".) The mind, citta, is concentrated upon a gross object of meditation, an object with a manifest appearance that is perceptible to our senses, such as a flame of a lamp, the tip of the nose, or the image of a deity. Conceptualization (vikalpa) still takes place, in the form of perception, the word and the knowledge of the object of meditation. When deliberation ends, this is called nirvitarka samāpatti, where the mind transcends cognitive perception and consciousness directly encounters true reality. (Note: Yoga Sutra 1.43: "When memory is purified, the mind appears to be emptied of its own nature and only the object shines forth. This is superdeliberative (nirvitarka) samāpatti".)
- Savichara, "reflective": the mind, citta, is concentrated upon a subtle object of meditation, which is not perceptible to the senses, but arrived at through inference, such as the senses, the process of cognition, the mind, the I-am-ness, (Note: Following Yoga Sutra 1.17, meditation on the sense of "I-am-ness" is also grouped, in other descriptions, as "sāsmitā samāpatti") the chakras, the inner-breath (prana), the nadis, the intellect (buddhi). Baba Hari Dass noted that in savichāra samādhi mind principally reflects the subtle objects of the senses (tanmātra) and their characteristics of space (deśha) and time (kāla), as well as their causation (nimitta) via the sense of "I-am-ness". The stilling of reflection is called nirvichara samāpatti. (Note: Yoga Sutra 1.44: "In this way, reflective (savichara) and super-reflective (nirvichara) samāpatti, which are based on subtle objects, are also explained".)

The last two associations, sānanda samādhi and sāsmitā, are respectively a state of meditation, and an object of savichara samādhi:
- Ānanda, "with bliss": also known as "supreme bliss", or "with ecstasy", this state emphasizes the still subtler state of bliss in meditation; ānanda is free from vitarka and vicara.
- Āsmitā, "with egoity": the citta is concentrated upon the sense or feeling of "I-am-ness".

- Asamprajñata samādhi (also called nirvikalpa samādhi and nirbija samādhi) refers to samādhi without the support of an object of meditation, which leads to knowledge of purusha or consciousness, the subtlest element. (Note: According to Jianxin Li, Asamprajnata Samādhi may be compared to the arupa jhānas of Buddhism, and to Nirodha-samāpatti. Crangle also notes that sabija-asamprajnata samādhi resembles the four formless jhānas. According to Crangle, the fourth arupa jhāna is the stage of transition to Patanjali's "consciousness without seed".)

==== Samprajñata samādhi ====
According to Paramahansa Yogananda, in this state one lets go of the ego and becomes aware of Spirit beyond creation. The soul is then able to absorb the fire of Spirit-Wisdom that "roasts" or destroys the seeds of body-bound inclinations. The soul as the meditator, its state of meditation, and the Spirit as the object of meditation all become one. The separate wave of the soul meditating in the ocean of Spirit becomes merged with the Spirit. The soul does not lose its identity, but only expands into Spirit. In savikalpa samādhi the mind is conscious only of the Spirit within; it is not conscious of the exterior world. The body is in a trancelike state, but the consciousness is fully perceptive of its blissful experience within.

Apollo 14 astronaut Edgar Mitchell, founder of the Institute of Noetic Sciences, has compared the experience of seeing the earth from space, also known as the overview effect, to savikalpa samādhi.

===== Ānanda and asmitā =====
According to Ian Whicher, the status of ānanda and āsmitā in Patanjali's system is a matter of dispute. According to Maehle, the first two constituents, deliberation and reflection, form the basis of the various types of samāpatti. According to Feuerstein:

"Joy" and "I-am-ness" [...] must be regarded as accompanying phenomena of every cognitive [ecstasy]. The explanations of the classical commentators on this point appear to be foreign to Patanjali's hierarchy of [ecstatic] states, and it seems unlikely that ānanda and asmita should constitute independent levels of samādhi.

Ian Whicher disagrees with Feuerstein, seeing ānanda and asmitā as later stages of nirvicara-samāpatti. Whicher refers to Vācaspati Miśra (900–980 CE), the founder of the Bhāmatī Advaita Vedanta who proposes eight types of samāpatti:

- Savitarka-samāpatti and nirvitarka-samāpatti, both with gross objects as objects of support;
- Savicāra-samāpatti and nirvicāra-samāpatti, both with subtle objects as objects of support;
- Sānanda-samāpatti and nirānanda-samāpatti, both with the sense organs as objects of support
- Sāsmitā-samāpatti and nirasmitā-samāpatti, both with the sense of "I-am-ness" as support.

Vijnana Bikshu (c. 1550–1600) proposes a six-stage model, explicitly rejecting Vacaspati Misra's model. Vijnana Bikshu regards joy (ānanda) as a state that arises when the mind passes beyond the vicara stage. Whicher agrees that ānanda is not a separate stage of samādhi. According to Whicher, Patanjali's own view seems to be that nirvicara-samādhi is the highest form of cognitive ecstasy.

According to Sarasvati Buhrman, "Babaji once explained that when people feel blissful sensations during sādhanā, on a gross level the breath is equal in both nostrils, and on the subtle level pranic flow in ida and pingala nadis is balanced. This is called the sushumna breath because the residual prana of the sushuma, the kundalini, flows in sushumna nadi, causing sattva guna to dominate. "It creates a feeling of peace. That peace is ānanda". In sānanda samādhi the experience of that ānanda, that sattvic flow, is untainted by any other vrittis, or thoughts, save the awareness of the pleasure of receiving that bliss".

==== Asamprajñata samādhi ====
According to Maehle, asamprajñata samādhi (also called nirvikalpa samādhi and nirbija samādhi) leads to knowledge of purusha or consciousness, the subtlest element. Heinrich Zimmer distinguishes nirvikalpa samādhi from other states as follows:

Nirvikalpa samādhi, on the other hand, absorption without self-consciousness, is a mergence of the mental activity (cittavṛtti) in the Self, to such a degree, or in such a way, that the distinction (vikalpa) of knower, act of knowing, and object known becomes dissolved — as waves vanish in water, and as foam vanishes into the sea.

Swami Sivananda describes nirbija samādhi (lit. "samādhi" without seeds) as follows:

"Without seeds or Samskaras [...] All the seeds or impressions are burnt by the fire of knowledge [...] all the Samskaras and Vasanas which bring on rebirths are totally freed up. All Vrittis or mental modifications that arise from the mind-lake come under restraint. The five afflictions, viz., Avidya (ignorance), Asmita (egoism), Raga-dvesha (love and hatred) and Abhinivesha (clinging to life) are destroyed and the bonds of Karma are annihilated [...] It gives Moksha (deliverance from the wheel of births and deaths). With the advent of the knowledge of the Self, ignorance vanishes. With the disappearance of the root-cause, viz., ignorance, egoism, etc., also disappear".

=== Sahaja samadhi ===
Ramana Maharshi distinguished between kevala nirvikalpa samadhi and sahaja nirvikalpa samādhi: (Note: David Godman, 'I' and 'I-I' – A Reader's Query) (Note: What is Liberation According to the Teachings of Sri Ramana Maharshi?)

Sahaja samadhi is a state in which a silent level within the subject is maintained along with (simultaneously with) the full use of the human faculties.

Kevala nirvikalpa samādhi is temporary, whereas sahaja nirvikalpa samādhi is a continuous state throughout daily activity. This state seems inherently more complex than sāmadhi, since it involves several aspects of life, namely external activity, internal quietude, and the relation between them. It also seems to be a more advanced state, since it comes after the mastering of samādhi. (Note: Compare the Ten Bulls from Zen) (Note: See also Mouni Sadhu (2005), Meditation: An Outline for Practical Study, p.92-93)

Sahaja is one of the four keywords of the Nath sampradaya along with Svecchachara, Sama, and Samarasa. Sahaja meditation and worship was prevalent in Tantric traditions common to Hinduism and Buddhism in Bengal as early as the 8th–9th centuries.

=== Nirvikalpaka yoga ===
Nirvikalpaka yoga is a term in the philosophical system of Shaivism, in which, through samādhi, there is a complete identification of the "I" and Shiva, in which the very concepts of name and form disappear and Shiva alone is experienced as the real Self. In that system, this experience occurs when there is complete cessation of all thought-constructs.

=== Bhāva samādhi ===
Bhāva samādhi is a state of ecstatic consciousness that can sometimes be a seemingly spontaneous experience, but is recognized generally to be the culmination of long periods of devotional practices. It is believed by some groups to be evoked through the presence of "higher beings". Bhāva samādhi has been experienced by notable figures in Indian spiritual history, including Sri Ramakrishna Paramahamsa and some of his disciples, Chaitanya Mahaprabhu and his chief disciple Nityananda, Mirabai and numerous saints in the bhakti tradition.

=== Mahāsamādhi ===
In Hindu or Yogic traditions, mahāsamādhi, the "great" and final samādhi, is the act of consciously and intentionally leaving one's body at the moment of death. According to this belief, a realized and liberated (Jivanmukta) yogi or yogini who has attained the state of nirvikalpa samādhi can consciously exit from their body and attain liberation at the moment of death while in a deep, conscious meditative state.

Some individuals have, according to their followers, declared the day and time of their mahāsamādhi beforehand. These include Lahiri Mahasaya whose death on September 26, 1895, was of this nature, according to Paramahansa Yogananda. Paramahansa Yogananda's own death on March 7, 1952, was described by his followers as entering mahāsamādhi. Daya Mata, one of Yogananda's direct disciples, said that Yogananda on the previous evening had asked her "Do you realize that it is just a matter of hours and I will be gone from this earth?"

In the seventh chapter of Autobiography of a Yogi, titled "The Levitating Saint," Paramahansa Yogananda presents a vivid and inspiring account of the exalted life of Bhaduri Mahasaya, also known as Paramahansa Maharshi Nagendranath. Bhaduri Mahasaya relinquished his mortal body on 2 November 1926. To his devotees, this sacred day is reverently observed as Bhaduri Mahasaya's Mahāsamādhi Day. Even today, his Mahāsamādhi Tithi continues to be commemorated with deep devotion and reverence at Shree Shree Nagendra Math and Nagendra Mission in Kolkata.

=== Samadhi in the Bhagavad Gita ===
The Bhagavad Gita describes samadhi as the ultimate state of spiritual realization, marked by profound steadiness of mind and deep absorption in the true self. This state emerges when one transcends attachments to worldly pleasures and power (verse 2.44) and achieves a resolute, unwavering intellect fixed in spiritual truth, free from confusion (verse 2.53).

=== Buddhist influences ===
Patanjali's description of samādhi resembles the Buddhist jhānas. (Note: See also Eddie Crangle (1984), Hindu and Buddhist techniques of Attaining Samadhi) According to Jianxin Li, samprajñata samādhi may be compared to the rūpa jhānas of Buddhism. This interpretation may conflict with Gombrich and Wynne, according to whom the first and second jhāna represent concentration, whereas the third and fourth jhāna combine concentration with mindfulness. According to Eddie Crangle, the first jhāna resembles Patanjali's samprajñata samādhi, which both share the application of vitarka and vicara.

According to David Gordon White, the language of the Yoga Sūtras is often closer to "Buddhist Hybrid Sanskrit, the Sanskrit of the early Mahāyana Buddhist scriptures, than to the classical Sanskrit of other Hindu scriptures". According to Karel Werner:

Patanjali's system is unthinkable without Buddhism. As far as its terminology goes there is much in the Yoga Sutras that reminds us of Buddhist formulations from the Pāli Canon and even more so from the Sarvastivada Abhidharma and from Sautrāntika".

Robert Thurman writes that Patañjali was influenced by the success of the Buddhist monastic system to formulate his own matrix for the version of thought he considered orthodox. However, the Yoga Sutra, especially the fourth segment of Kaivalya Pada, contains several polemical verses critical of Buddhism, particularly the Vijñānavāda school of Vasubandhu.

While Patañjali was influenced by Buddhism, and incorporated Buddhist thought and terminology, the term "nirvikalpa samādhi" is unusual in a Buddhist context, though some authors have equated nirvikalpa samādhi with the formless jhānas and/or nirodha samāpatti.

A similar term, nirvikalpa-jñāna, is found in the Buddhist Yogacara tradition, and is translated by Edward Conze as "undifferentiated cognition". Conze notes that, in Yogacara, only the actual experience of nirvikalpa-jñāna can prove the reports given of it in scriptures. He describes the term as used in the Yogacara context as follows:

The "undiscriminate cognition" knows first the unreality of all objects, then realizes that without them also the knowledge itself falls to the ground, and finally directly intuits the supreme reality. Great efforts are made to maintain the paradoxical nature of this gnosis. Though without concepts, judgements and discrimination, it is nevertheless not just mere thoughtlessness. It is neither a cognition nor a non-cognition; its basis is neither thought nor non-thought.... There is here no duality of subject and object. The cognition is not different from that which is cognized, but completely identical with it. (Note: Routledge 2013 edition: note 854)

A different sense in Buddhist usage occurs in the Sanskrit expression nirvikalpayati (Pali: nibbikappa) that means "makes free from uncertainty (or false discrimination)" i.e. "distinguishes, considers carefully".

== Sikhism ==
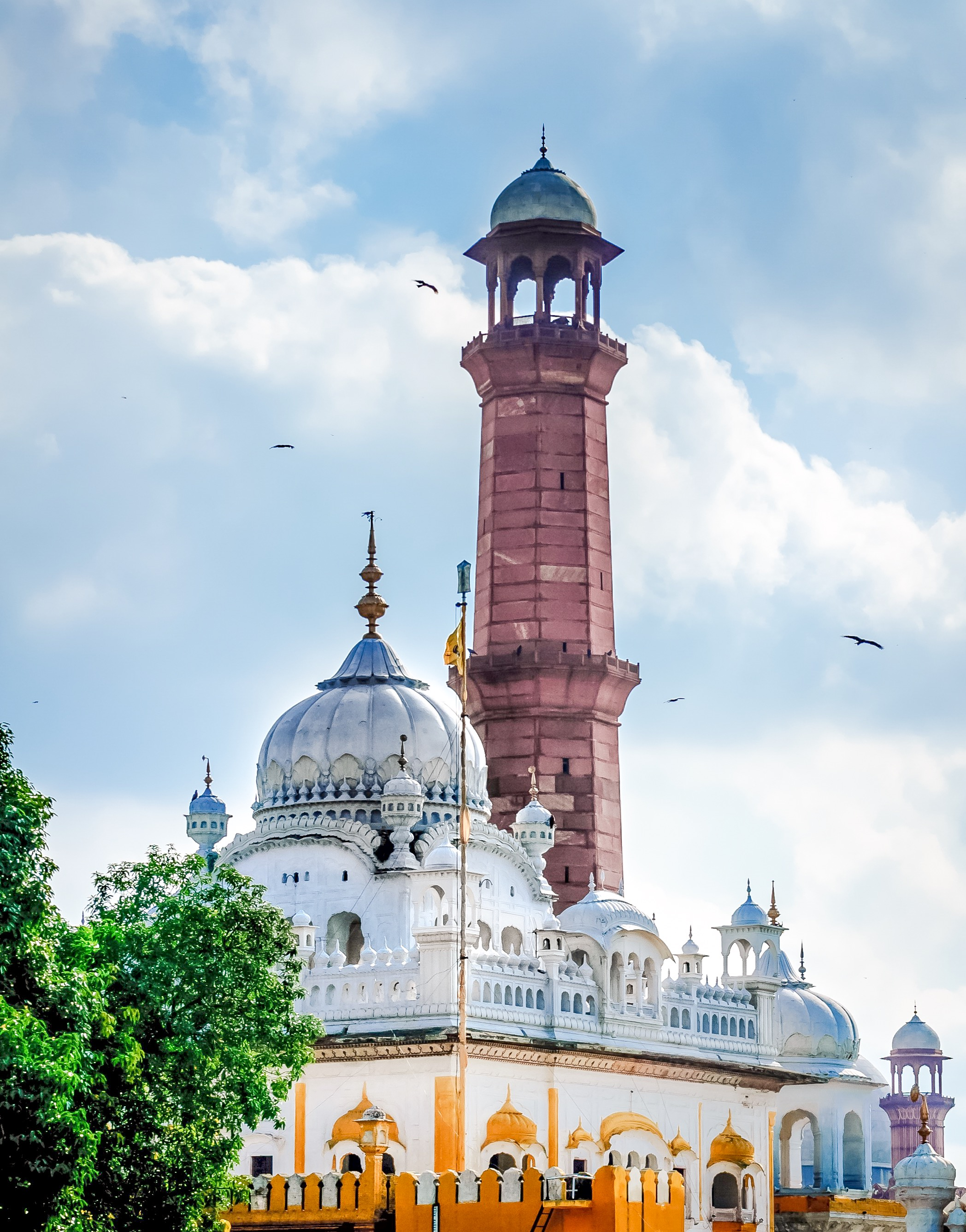
The Samadhi of Ranjit Singh is located next to the iconic Badshahi Masjid in Lahore, Pakistan.

In Sikhism the word is used to refer to an action that one uses to remember and fix one's mind and soul on Waheguru. The Sri Guru Granth Sahib informs:

- "Remember in meditation the Almighty Lord, every moment and every instant; meditate on God in the celestial peace of Samādhi." (p. 508)
- "I am attached to God in celestial Samādhi." (p. 865)
- "The most worthy Samādhi is to keep the consciousness stable and focused on Him." (p. 932)

The term Samadhi refers to a state of mind rather than a physical position of the body. The Scriptures explain:

- "I am absorbed in celestial Samādhi, lovingly attached to the Lord forever. I live by singing the Glorious Praises of the Lord" (p. 1232)
- "Night and day, they ravish and enjoy the Lord within their hearts; they are intuitively absorbed in Samadhi. ||2||" (p. 1259)

The Sikh Gurus inform their followers:

- "Some remain absorbed in Samādhi, their minds fixed lovingly on the One Lord; they reflect only on the Word of the Shabad." (p. 503)

== Sufism ==
The idea of Fanaa in Sufi Islam has been compared to Samadhi.

== See also ==
Buddhism

- Bhāvanā
- Samatha
- Sati (Buddhism)
- Satori
- Vipassanā

General

- Ego death
- Nondualism
- Religious ecstasy
- Samadhi (shrine)

Hinduism

- Dhyana in Hinduism
- Rāja yoga
- Bhakti Yoga
- Turiya

Islam

- Baqaa
- Fanaa

Jainism

- Yogadṛṣṭisamuccaya
- Jain meditation

Western traditions

- Stoicism

== Sources ==
Printed sources

- Nagarjuna (2001). "Chapter X - The Qualities of the Bodhisattvas". Mahāprajñāpāramitāśāstra. Translated by Migme, Ani.
- Arbel, Keren (2016), Early Buddhist Meditation: The Four Jhanas as the Actualization of Insight, Routledge, doi:10.4324/9781315676043, ISBN 9781317383994
- Berzin, Alexander (2006), Primary Minds and the 51 Mental Factors
- Bronkhorst, Johannes (1993), The Two Traditions Of Meditation In Ancient India, Motilal Banarsidass Publ.
- Bucknell, Robert S. (1993), "Reinterpreting the Jhanas", Journal of the International Association of Buddhist Studies, 16 (2): 375–409
- Buddhaghosa, Bhadantacariya (1999), The Path of Purification: Visuddhimagga, translated by Bhikkhu Nyanamoli, Seattle: BPS Pariyatti Editions, ISBN 1-928706-00-2
- Chen, Naichen (2017), The Great Prajna Paramita Sutra, Volume 1, Wheatmark
- Conze, Edward (1962). Buddhist Thought in India. Allen & Unwin.
- Crangle, Eddie (1984), "A Comparison of Hindu and Buddhist Techniques of Attaining Samādhi" ( (PDF)), in Hutch, R.A.; Fenner, P.G. (eds.), Under The Shade of the Coolibah Tree: Australian Studies in Consciousness, University Press of America, archived from the original on 2021-09-01
- Crangle, Edward Fitzpatrick (1994), The Origin and Development of Early Indian Contemplative Practices, Harrassowitz Verlag
- Diener, Michael S.; Erhard, Franz-Karl; Fischer-Schreiber, Ingrid (1991). The Shambhala Dictionary of Buddhism and Zen. Translated by Michael H. Kohn. Shambhala.
- Edgerton, Franklin (1953). Buddhist Hybrid Sanskrit Grammar and Dictionary. Motilal Banarsidass. ISBN 0-89581-180-4.
- Farquhar, J. N. (1920), Outline of the Religious Literature of India, Motilal Banarsidass, ISBN 978-81-208-2086-9
- Forman, Robert K.C. (1999), Mysticism, Mind, Consciousness, SUNY Press
- Fuller-Sasaki, Ruth (2008), The Record of Lin-Ji, University of Hawaii Press
- Gomez, Luis O.; Silk, Jonathan A. (1989). Studies in the literature of the great vehicle : three Mahāyāna Buddhist texts. Ann Arbor: Collegiate Institute for the Study of Buddhist Literature and Center for South and Southeast Asian Studies, University of Michigan. ISBN 0891480544.
- Guenther, Herbert V.; Kawamura, Leslie S. (1975), Mind in Buddhist Psychology: A Translation of Ye-shes rgyal-mtshan's "The Necklace of Clear Understanding" (Kindle ed.), Dharma Publishing
- Hui-Neng (1998). The Sutra of Hui-neng, grand master of Zen : with Hui-neng's commentary on the Diamond Sutra. Translated by Thomas Cleary. Boston: Shambhala. ISBN 9781570623486.
- Jianxin Li (2018), "A Comparative Study between Yoga and Indian Buddhism" (PDF), International Journal for the Study of Chan Buddhism and Human Civilization (3), asianscholarship.org: 107–123
- Johansson, Rune Edvin Anders (1981), Pali Buddhist Texts: Explained to the Beginner, Psychology Press
- Jones, Constance; Ryan, James D. (2006), Encyclopedia of Hinduism, Infobase Publishing, ISBN 9780816075645
- Kalupahana, David J. (1994), A history of Buddhist philosophy, Delhi: Motilal Banarsidass Publishers Private Limited
- Kunsang, Erik Pema (2004), Gateway to Knowledge, Vol. 1, North Atlantic Books
- Lusthaus, Dan (2002), Buddhist Phenomenology: A Philosophical Investigation of Yogacara Buddhism and the Ch'eng Wei-shih Lun, Routledge
- Lusthaus, Dan (2014). Buddhist Phenomenology: A Philosophical Investigation of Yogacara Buddhism. Routledge. p. 139. ISBN 978-1317973423.
- Maehle, Gregor (2007), Ashtanga Yoga: Practice and Philosophy, New World Library
- Maezumi, Taizan; Cook, Francis Dojun (2007), "The Eight Awarenesses of the Enlightened Person": Dogen Zenji's Hachidainingaku", in Maezumi, Taizan; Glassman, Bernie (eds.), The Hazy Moon of Enlightenment, Wisdom Publications
- McRae, John R. (2003). Seeing through Zen: Encounter, Transformation, and Genealogy in Chinese Chan Buddhism (1 ed.). University of California Press. ISBN 978-0-520-23797-1. JSTOR 10.1525/j.ctt1pnz84.
- Polak, Grzegorz (2011), Reexamining Jhana: Towards a Critical Reconstruction of Early Buddhist Soteriology, UMCS
- Pradhan, Basant (2015), Yoga and Mindfulness Based Cognitive Therapy, Springer
- Quli, Natalie (2008), "Multiple Buddhist Modernisms: Jhana in Convert Theravada" (PDF), Pacific World, 10: 225–249
- Rhys-Davids, T.W.; Stede, William, eds. (1921–25), The Pali Text Society's Pali–English dictionary, Pali Text Society)
- Sangpo, Gelong Lodro; Dhammajoti, Bhikkhu K.L. (2012), Abhidharmakośa-Bhāṣya of Vasubandhu: The Treasury of the Abhidharma and Its (Auto) Commentary, Motilal Banarsidass
- Sarbacker, Stuart Ray (2012), Samadhi: The Numinous and Cessative in Indo-Tibetan Yoga, SUNY Press, ISBN 9780791482810
- Sarbacker, Stuart Ray (2021), Tracing the Path of Yoga: The History and Philosophy of Indian Mind-Body Discipline, State University of New York Press
- Shankman, Richard (2008), The Experience of Samadhi, Shambhala Publications
- Siddheswarananda, Swami (1998), Hindu Thought and Carmelite Mysticism, Motilal Banarsidass Publ.
- Singh, Jaideva (1979). Śiva Sūtras. Motilal Banarsidass Publ. ISBN 978-81-208-0407-4.
- Skilton, Andrew (2002). "State or Statement?: "Samādhi" in Some Early Mahāyāna Sutras". The Eastern Buddhist. 34 (2): 51–93. ISSN 0012-8708. JSTOR 44362317.
- Stuart-Fox, Martin (1989), "Jhana and Buddhist Scholasticism", Journal of the International Association of Buddhist Studies, 12 (2)
- Sturgess, Stephen (2014). Yoga Meditation. Oxford, UK: Watkins Publishing Limited. ISBN 978-1-78028-644-0.
- Sturgess, Stephen (2014a), The Book of Chakras & Subtle Bodies: Gateways to Supreme Consciousness, Watkins Media Limited
- Taimni, I.K. (1961), The Science of Yoga, Quest Books
- Vetter, Tilmann (1988), The Ideas and Meditative Practices of Early Buddhism, Leiden: Brill, ISBN 978-90-04-08959-4
- Wayman, Alex (1997), "Introduction", Calming the Mind and Discerning the Real: Buddhist Meditation and the Middle View, from the Lam Rim Chen Mo Tson-kha-pa, Motilal Banarsidass Publishers
- Williams, Paul (2009). Mahāyāna Buddhism : the doctrinal foundations (2nd ed.). London: Routledge. ISBN 9780415356534.
- Werner, Karel (1994). The Yogi and the Mystic. Routledge. ISBN 978-0700702725.
- Whicher, Ian (1998). The Integrity of the Yoga Darśana: A Reconsideration of Classical Yoga. SUNY Press. ISBN 978-0-7914-3815-2.
- White, David Gordon (2014). The 'Yoga Sutra of Patanjali': A Biography. Princeton University Press. ISBN 978-1-4008-5005-1.
- Wynne, Alexander (2007), The Origin of Buddhist Meditation, Routledge
- Zimmer, Heinrich (1951). Philosophies of India. New York, New York: Princeton University Press. ISBN 0-691-01758-1. Bollingen Series XXVI; Edited by Joseph Cambell.

Web-sources
