= Natha Sampradaya =

Yogic tradition within Shaivism

Nath Sampradaya
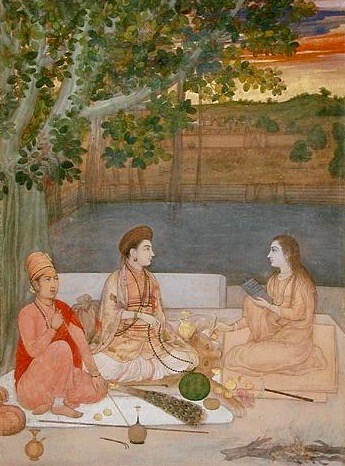
- Painting of Hindu Nath yoginis ca. 17th century

Founder
- Matsyendranatha

Regions with significant populations
- India

Religions
- Hinduism

Natha, also called Nath (Sanskrit: नाथसम्प्रदाय, romanized: Nāthasaṃpradāya), are a Shaiva sub-tradition within Hinduism in India and Nepal which emerged in the 12th and 13th centuries. It combines influences from Buddhism, Shaivism, Tantra and Yoga traditions of the Indian subcontinent. The Naths have been a confederation of devotees who consider Shiva as their first lord or guru, with varying lists of additional gurus. Of these, the 9th- or 10th-century Matsyendranatha and the ideas and organization mainly developed by Gorakhnath are particularly important. Gorakhnath is considered the originator of the Nath Panth. Chaurangi Nath was another devotee of Matsyendra that forks a different lineage although he is also part of the lineage of Gorakh. Chauranginath's lineage was the chosen path of Maitreya Parameshvara on His return. Another prominent figure is Balaji Nath or Balaknath which defied Gorakh's religious imposition.

The Nath tradition has an extensive Shaivism-related theological literature of its own, most of which is traceable to the 11th century CE or later. They are a subgroup of the Siddha tradition, and related to heterodox ascetic Shaivite traditions especially the Kapalika and the Kaula, but also the Pashupata and the Saktas. A notable aspect of Nath tradition practice has been its refinements and use of Yoga, particularly Hatha Yoga, to transform one's body into a sahaja siddha state of an awakened self’s identity with absolute reality. An accomplished guru, that is, a yoga and spiritual guide, is considered essential, and the Nath tradition has historically been known for its esoteric and heterodox practices.

The unconventional ways of the Nath tradition challenged all orthodox premises, exploring dark and shunned practices of society as a means to understanding theology and gaining inner powers. They formed monastic organizations, itinerant groups that walked great distances to sacred sites and festivals such as the Kumbh Mela as a part of their spiritual practice. The Nath also have a large settled householder tradition in parallel to its monastic groups. Some of them metamorphosed into warrior ascetics during the Islamic rule of the Indian subcontinent.

The Nath tradition was influenced by other Indian traditions such as Advaita Vedanta monism, and in turn influenced it as well as movements within Vaishnavism, Shaktism and Bhakti movement through saints such as Kabir and Namdev. The Naths also composed some of the earliest known works in Punjabi.

== Etymology and nomenclature ==
The Sanskrit word nātha नाथ literally means "lord, protector, master". The related Sanskrit term Adi Natha means first or original Lord, and is a synonym for Shiva, the founder of the Nāthas. Initiation into the Nātha sampradaya includes receiving a name ending in -nath, -yogi, or -jogi.

According to the yoga scholar James Mallinson, the term Nath is a neologism for various groups previously known as yogi or jogi before the 18th century. Within the Natha tradition, however, it is said that the identifier Nath began with the figures of Matsyendranatha in the 10th century and his guru Shiva, known as Adinath (first lord). During East India Company and later British Raj rule, itinerant yogis were suppressed and many were forced into householder life. Many of their practices were banned in an attempt to limit their political and military power in North India.

During colonial rule the term Yogi/Jogi became a derisive word and they were classified by British India census as a "low status caste". In the 20th century, the community began to use the alternate term Nath instead in their public relations, while continuing to use their historical term of yogi or jogi to refer to each other within the community. The term Nath or Natha, with the meaning of lord, is a generic Sanskrit theological term found in all the dharmic religions that utilize Sanskrit. It is found in Vaishnavism (e.g. Gopinath, Jagannath), Buddhism (e.g. Minanath), and in Jainism (Adinatha, Parsvanatha).

The term yogi or jogi is not limited to Natha subtradition, and has been widely used in Indian culture for anyone who is routinely devoted to yoga. Some memoirs by travelers such as those by the Italian traveler Varthema refer to the Nath Yogi people they met, phonetically as Ioghes.

== History ==
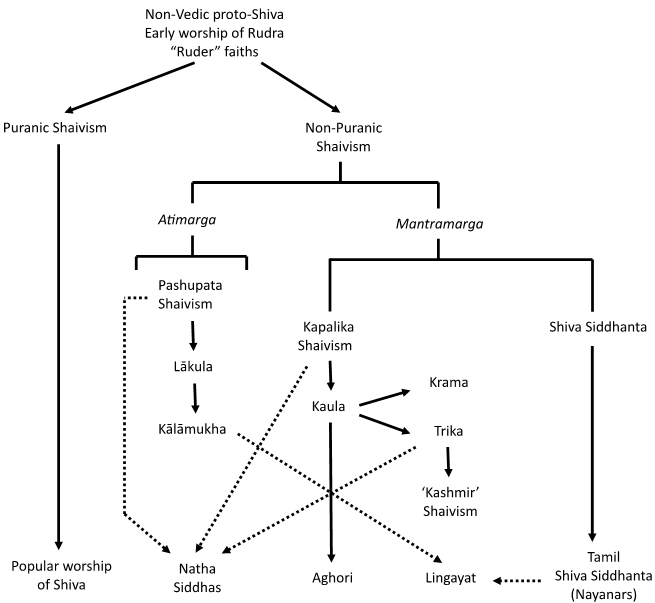
The development of various schools of Shaivism from pre-Vedic Shiva and early worship of Rudra.

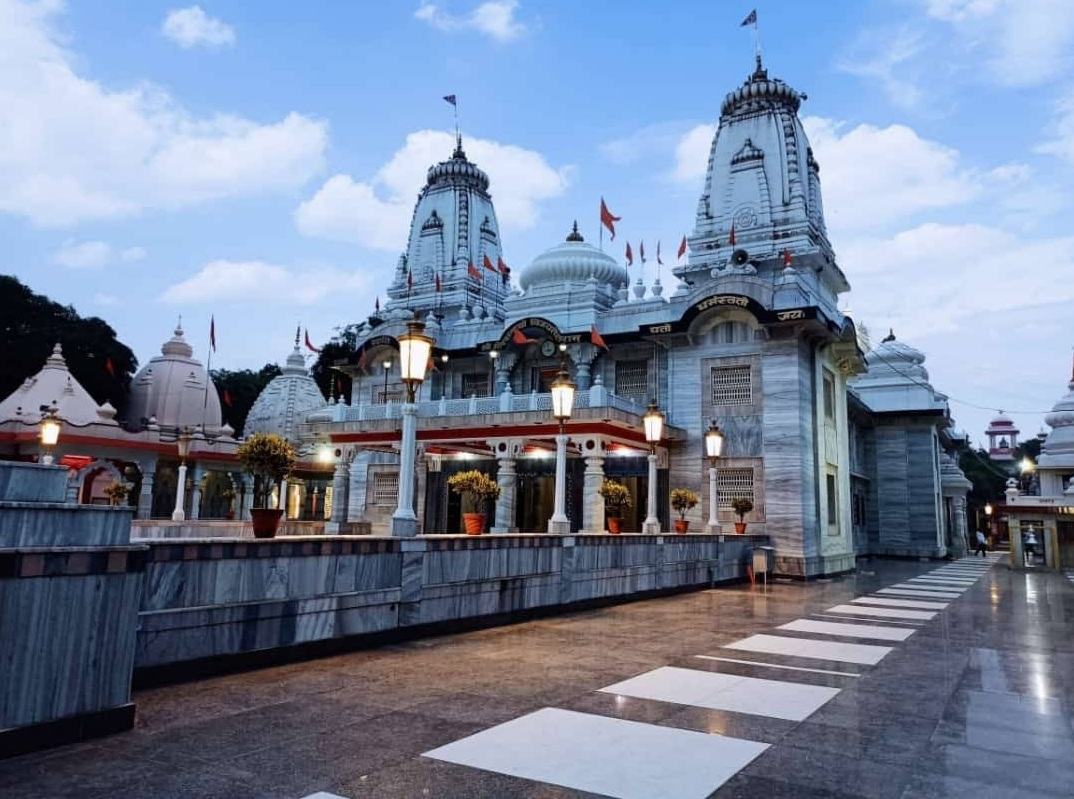
Gorakhnath Math in Gorakhpur, Uttar Pradesh

The Nath are a subgroup of the Siddha tradition, and related to heterodox ascetic Shaivite traditions especially the Kapalika and the Kaula, but also the Pasupatha and the Saktas. They trace their lineage to nine Nath gurus, starting with Shiva as the first, or ‘’Adinatha’’. The list of the remaining eight is somewhat inconsistent between the regions Nath sampradaya is found, but typically consists of c. 9th century Matsyendranatha and c. 12th century Gorakhshanatha along with six more. The other six vary between Buddhist texts such as Abhyadattasri, and Hindu texts such as Varnaratnakara and Hathapradipika. The most common remaining Nath gurus include Caurangi (Sarangadhara, Puran Bhagat), Jalandhara (Balnath, Hadipa), Carpatha, Kanhapa, Nagarjuna and Bhartrihari.

The Nath tradition was not a new movement, but one evolutionary phase of a very old Siddha tradition of India. The Siddha tradition explored Yoga, with the premise that human existence is a psycho-chemical process that can be perfected by a right combination of psychological, alchemy and physical techniques, thereby empowering one to a state of highest spirituality, living in prime condition ad libitum, and dying when one so desires into a calm, blissful transcendental state. The term siddha means "perfected", and this premise was not limited to the Siddha tradition but was shared by others such as the Rasayana school of Ayurveda.

=== Deccan roots ===
According to Mallinson, "the majority of the early textual and epigraphic references to Matsyendra and Goraksa are from the Deccan region and elsewhere in peninsular India; the others are from eastern India". The oldest iconography of Nath-like yogis is found in the Konkan region (near the coast of Maharashtra, Goa, Karnataka). The Vijayanagara Empire artworks include them, as do texts from a region now known as Maharashtra, northern Karnataka and Kerala. The Chinese traveller, named Ma Huan, visited a part of the western coast of India, wrote a memoir, and he mentions the Nath Yogis. The oldest texts of the Nath tradition that describe pilgrimage sites include predominantly sites in the Deccan region and the eastern states of India, with hardly any mention of north, northwest or south India. This community also can be found in some parts of Rajasthan but these are normal like other castes, considered as other backward castes.

Gorakhshanatha is traditionally credited with founding the tradition of renunciate ascetics, but the earliest textual references about the Nath ascetic order as an organized entity (sampradaya), that have survived into the modern era, are from the 17th century. Before the 17th century, while a mention of the Nath sampradaya as a monastic institution is missing, extensive isolated mentions about the Nath Shaiva people are found in inscriptions, texts and temple iconography from earlier centuries.

In the Deccan region, only since the 18th century according to Mallison, Dattatreya has been traditionally included as a Nath guru as a part of Vishnu-Shiva syncretism. According to others, Dattatreya has been the revered as the Adi-Guru (First Teacher) of the Adinath Sampradaya of the Nathas, the first "Lord of Yoga" with mastery of Tantra (techniques).

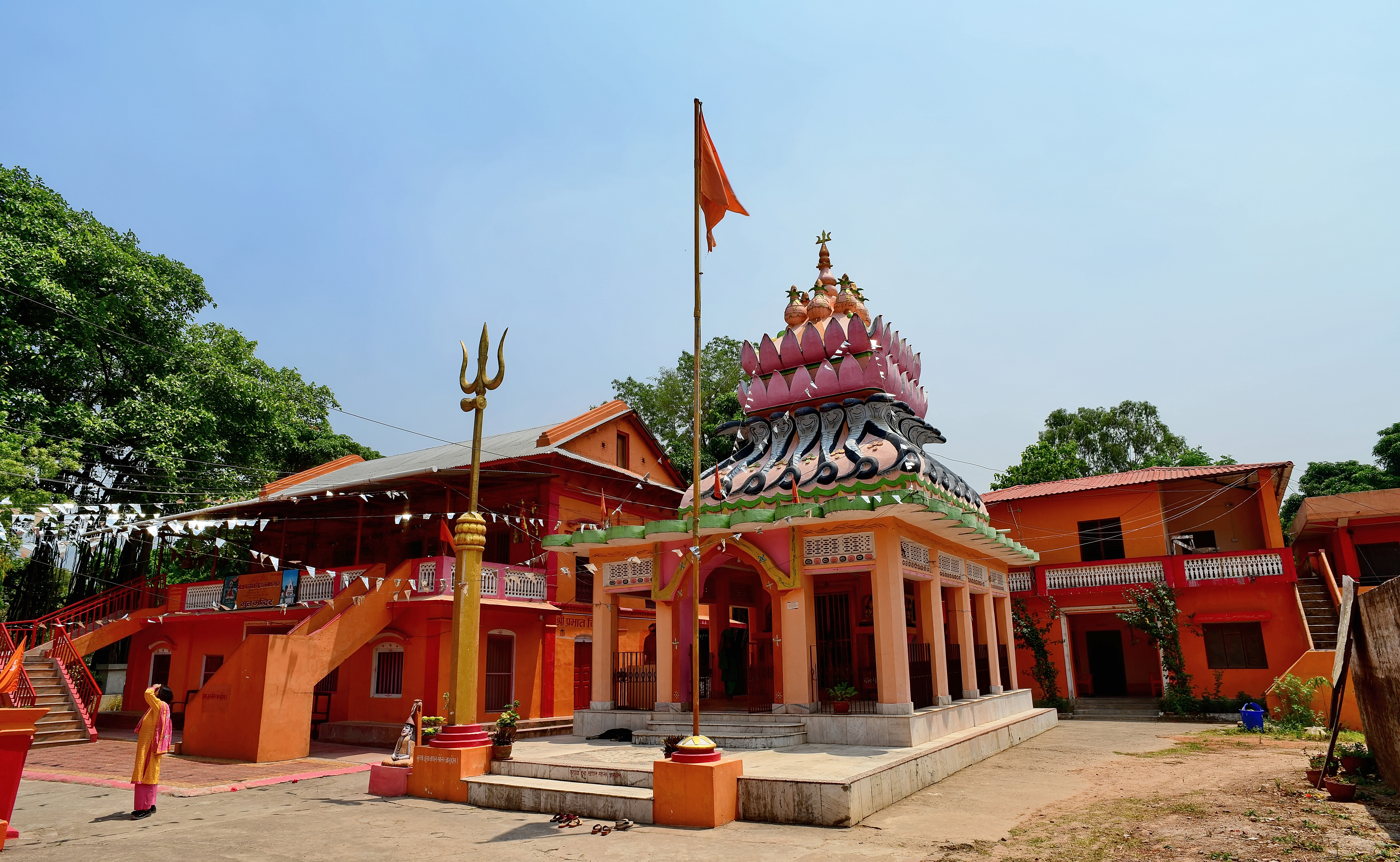
A historical Nath temple in Dang, Nepal

The number of Nath gurus also varies between texts, ranging from 4, 9, 18, 25 and so on. The earliest known text that mentions nine Nath gurus is the 15th-century Telugu text Navanatha Charitra. Individually, the names of Nath Gurus appear in much older texts. For example, Matsyendranatha is mentioned as a siddha in section 29.32 of the 10th century text Tantraloka of the Advaita and Shaivism scholar Abhinavagupta.

The mention of Nath gurus as siddhas in Buddhist texts found in Tibet and the Himalayan regions led early scholars to propose that Naths may have Buddhist origins, but the Nath doctrines and theology is unlike mainstream Buddhism. In the Tibetan tradition, Matsyendranatha of Hinduism is identified with Luipa, one referred to as the first of Buddhist Siddhacharyas. In Nepal, he is a form of Buddhist Avalokiteshvara.

According to Deshpande, the Natha Sampradaya, is a development of the earlier Siddha or Avadhuta Sampradaya, an ancient lineage of spiritual masters. They may be linked to Kapalikas or Kalamukhas given they share their unorthodox lifestyle, though neither the doctrines nor the evidence that links them has been uncovered. The Nath Yogis were deeply admired by the Bhakti movement saint Kabir.

=== Natha Panthis ===
The Nath Sampradaya is traditionally divided into twelve streams or Panths. According to David Gordon White, these panths were not really a subdivision of a monolithic order, but rather an amalgamation of separate groups descended from either Matsyendranatha, Gorakshanatha or one of their students. However, there have always been many more Natha sects than will conveniently fit into the twelve formal panths.

In Goa, the town called Madgaon may have been derived from Mathgram, a name it received from being a center of Nath Sampradaya Mathas (monasteries). Nath yogis practiced yoga and pursued their beliefs there, living inside caves. The Divar island and Pilar rock-cut caves were used for meditation by the Nath yogis. In the later half of the 16th century, they were persecuted for their religious beliefs and forced to convert by the Portuguese Christian missionaries. Except for few, the Nath yogi chose to abandon the village.

=== Contemporary lineages ===
The Inchegeri Sampradaya, also known as Nimbargi Sampradaya, is a lineage of Hindu Navnath teachers from Maharashtra which was started by Shri Bhausaheb Maharaj. It is inspired by Sant Mat teachers as Namdev, Raidas and Kabir. The Inchegeri Sampraday has become well-known through the popularity of Nisargadatta Maharaj.

== Practices ==
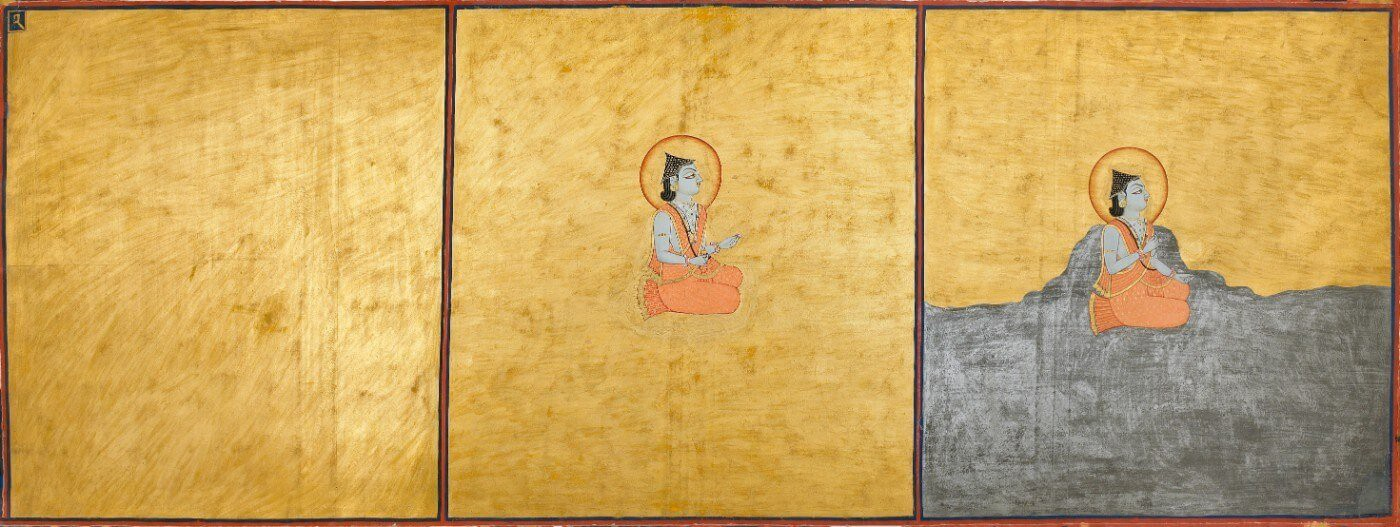
Three Aspects of The Absolute, miniature by Bulaki from the manuscript of Shri Nath Charit, definitive text of the Nath yogis. Jodhpur, 1823. Mehrangarh Museum Trust

The Nath tradition has two branches, one consisting of sadhus (celibate monks) and other married householder (laypeople). The householders are significantly more in number than monks and have the characteristics of an endogamous caste. Both Nath sadhus and householders are found in Nepal and India, particularly in West Bengal, Nepal, Uttarakhand, Uttar Pradesh, Rajasthan and Karnataka. The ascetics created an oversight organization called the Barah Panthi Yogi Mahasabha in 1906, based in the Hindu sacred town of Haridwar. According to an estimate by Bouillier in 2008, there are about 10,000 ascetics (predominantly males) in the Nath ascetic order, in about 500 monasteries across India, mainly in the northern and western regions of India, along with a much larger householder Nath tradition. The oldest known Nath monastery still in use is Kadri matha near Mangalore in Karnataka., which houses Shaiva iconography from the 10th century.

A notable feature of the monks is that most of them are itinerant, moving from one monastery or location to another, never staying in the same place for long. Many form floating groups of wanderers who participate in festivals together, share work and thus form a collective identity. They gather in certain places cyclically, particularly during Navaratri, Maha Shivaratri and Kumbh Mela. Many people walk for months across India, covering long distances between sacred locations in their spiritual pursuits.

The Nath monks wear loincloths and dhotis and little else. Typically they also cover themselves with ashes, tie up their hair in dreadlocks, and when they stop walking, they keep a sacred fire called dhuni. These ritual dressing, covering body with ash, and the body art are, however, uncommon with the householders. Both the Nath monks and householders wear a woolen thread around their necks, called Singnad Janeu, with a small horn, rudraksha bead and a ring attached to the thread. The small horn is important to their religious practice and is blown during certain festivals, rituals and before meal. Many Nath monks and a few householders also wear notable earrings.

Some Nath ascetics who do tantra include smoking cannabis in flower (marijuana) or resin (charas, hashish) as an offering to Shiva and as part of their practice. The tradition is traditionally known for hatha yoga and tantra, but in contemporary times, the assiduous practice of hatha yoga and tantra is uncommon among the Naths. In some monasteries, the ritual worship is to goddesses and to their gurus such as Adinatha (Shiva), Matsyendranatha and Gorakhshanatha, particularly through bhajan and kirtans. They greet each other with ades (pronounced: "aadees").

=== Warrior ascetics ===
The Yogis and Shaiva sampradayas such as Nath metamorphosed into a warrior ascetic group in the late medieval era, with one group calling itself shastra-dharis (keepers of scriptures) and the other astra-dharis (keepers of weapons). The latter group grew and became particularly prominent during the Islamic period in South Asia, from about the 14th to 18th century.

== Gurus, siddhas, naths ==
The Nath tradition revere nine, twelve or more Nath gurus. For example, nine Naths are revered in the Navnath Sampradaya. The most revered teachers across its various subtraditions are:

The traditional gurus of Naths
| Guru | Depiction | Alternate names | Notability |
|---|---|---|---|
| Adiguru | | Shiva, Bhairava | Shiva is a pan-Hindu god |
| Matsyendra | | Mina, Macchandar, Macchaghna | 9th or 10th century yoga siddha, important to Kaula tantra traditions, revered for his unorthodox experimentations |
| Goraksha | | Gorakh | founder of monastic Nath Sampradaya, systematized yoga techniques, organization and monastery builder, Hatha Yoga texts attributed to him, known for his ideas on nirguna bhakti, 10th or 11th century |
| Jalandhara | | Jalandhari, Hadipa, Jvalendra, Balnath, Balgundai | 13th century siddha (may be earlier), from Jalandhar (Punjab), particularly revered in Rajasthan and Punjab regions |
| Kanhapa | | Kanhu, Kaneri, Krishnapada, Karnaripa, Krishnacharya | 10th century siddha, from Bengal region, revered by a distinct sub-tradition within the Natha people |
| Caurangi | | Sarangadhara, Puran Bhagat | a son of King Devapala of Bengal who renounced, revered in the northwest such as the Punjab region, a shrine to him is in Sialkot (now in Pakistan) |
| Carpath | | Charpath | lived in the Chamba region of the Himalayas, Himachal Pradesh, championed Avadhuta, taught that outer rituals do not matter, emphasized inner state of an individual |
| Bhartrihari | | | king of Ujjain who renounced his kingdom to become a yogi, a scholar |
| Gopichand | | | son of the Queen of Bengal who renounced, influential on other Indian religions |
| Revannath | | Hajji Ratan | a 13th-century siddha (may be earlier), revered in medieval Nepal and Punjab, cherished by both Naths and Sufis of north India |
| Dharamnath | | | a 15th-century siddha revered in Gujarat, founded a monastery in Kutch region, legends credit him to have made Kutch region liveable |
| Mastnath | | | founded a monastery in Haryana, an 18th-century siddha |

=== Matsyendranatha ===
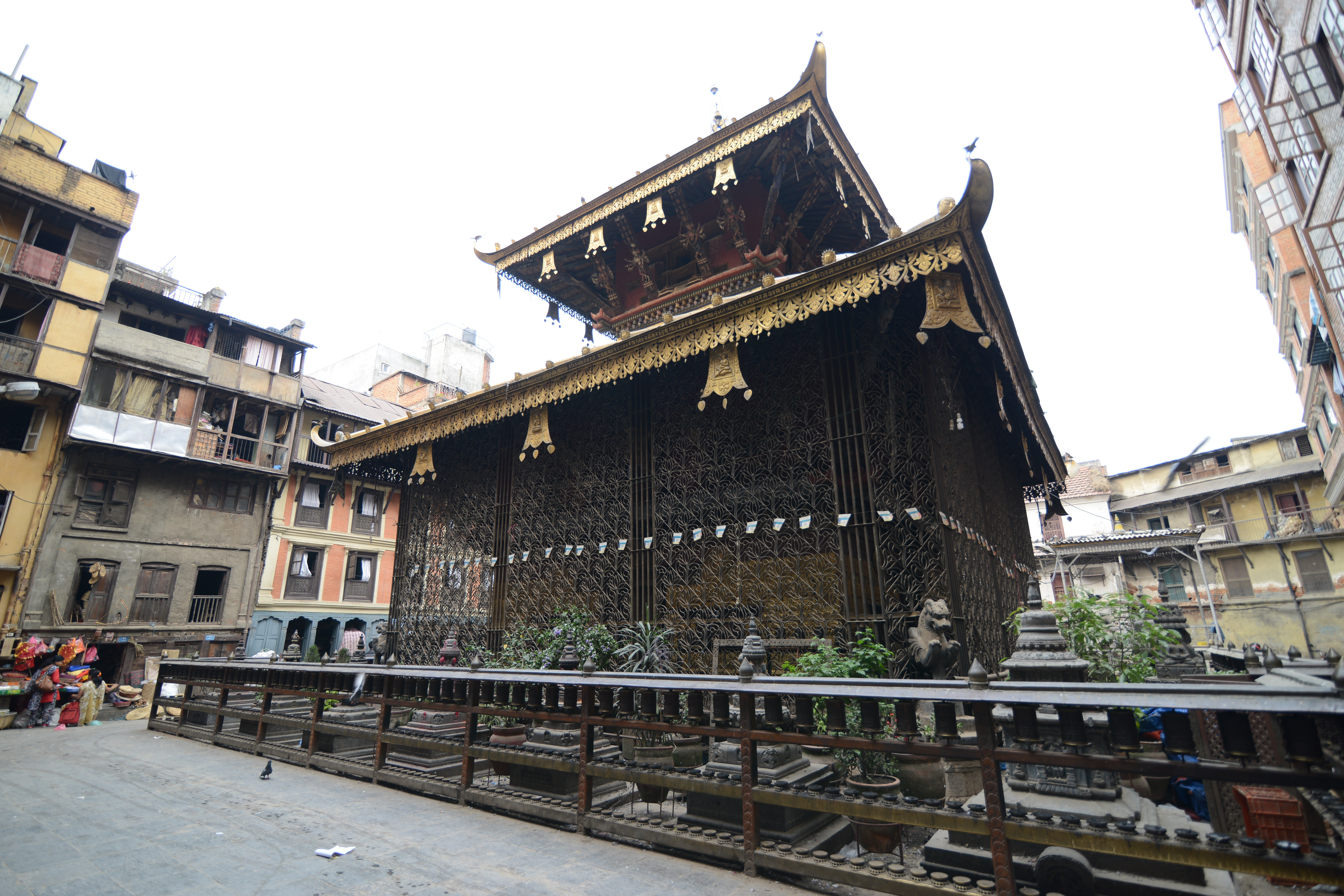
A Matsyendra (Macchendranath) Temple in Nepal, revered by both Buddhists and Hindus.

The establishment of the Naths as a distinct historical sect purportedly began around the 8th or 9th century with a simple fisherman, Matsyendranatha (sometimes called Minanath, who may be identified with or called the father of Matsyendranatha in some sources).

One of earliest known Hatha text Kaula Jnana Nirnaya is attributed to Matsyendra, and dated to the last centuries of the 1st millennium CE. Other texts attributed to him include the Akulavira tantra, Kulananda tantra and Jnana karika.

=== Gorakshanatha ===
Gorakshanatha is considered a Maha-yogi (or great yogi) in the Hindu tradition. Within the Nath tradition, he has been a revered figure, with Nath hagiography describing him as a superhuman who appeared on earth several times. The matha and the city of Gorakhpur in Uttar Pradesh is named after him. The Gurkhas of Nepal and Indian Gorkha take their name after him, as does Gorkha, a historical district of Nepal. The monastery and the temple in Gorakhpur perform various cultural and social activities and serves as the cultural hub of the city, and publishes texts on the philosophy of Gorakhnath. Gorakshanatha did not emphasize a specific metaphysical theory or a particular Truth, but emphasized that the search for Truth and spiritual life is valuable and a normal goal of man. Gorakshanatha championed Yoga, spiritual discipline and an ethical life of self-determination as a means to reaching siddha state, samadhi and one's own spiritual truths. Gorakshanatha, his ideas and yogis have been highly popular in rural India, with monasteries and temples dedicated to him found across the country, particularly in the eponymous city of Gorakhpur, whereas among urban elites, the movement founded by Gorakhnath has been ridiculed.

== Aims ==
According to Muller-Ortega (1989: p. 37), the primary aim of the ancient Nath Siddhas was to achieve liberation or jivan-mukti while alive, and ultimately "paramukti" which it defined as the state of liberation in the current life and into a divine state upon death. Muller-Ortega describes this as embodied realization: "It also allows the jivanmukta to become an embodied, powerful siddha, who possesses not just an ultimate vision, but is empowered by that vision to act and create as Siva himself". The Natha Sampradaya is an initiatory Guru-shishya tradition.

According to contemporary Nath Guru, Mahendranath, another aim is to avoid reincarnation. In The Magick Path of Tantra, he wrote about several of the aims of the Naths:

Our aims in life are to enjoy peace, freedom, and happiness in this life, but also to avoid rebirth onto this Earth plane. All this depends not on divine benevolence, but on the way we ourselves think and act.

== Hatha yoga ==
The earliest Hatha yoga texts of the Naths, such as Vivekamārtaṇḍa and Gorakhshasataka, are from Maharashtra, and these manuscripts are likely from the 13th century. These Nath texts, however, have an overlap with the 13th century Jnanadeva commentary on the Bhagavad Gita, the Jnanesvari. This may be the result of mutual influence, as both the texts integrate the teachings of Yoga and Vedanta schools of Hindu Philosophy in a similar way.

Numerous technical treatises in the Hindu tradition, composed in Sanskrit about Hatha Yoga, are attributed to Gorakshanatha.

== Influence ==
The Hatha Yoga ideas that developed in the Nath tradition influenced and were adopted by Advaita Vedanta, though some esoteric practices such as kechari-mudra were omitted. Their yoga ideas were also influential on Vaishnavism traditions such as the Ramanandis, as well as Sufi fakirs in the Indian subcontinent. The Naths recruited devotees into their fold irrespective of their religion or caste, converting Muslim yogins to their fold.

The Nath tradition was influenced by the Bhakti movement saints such as Kabir, Namdev and Jnanadeva.

== Caste system ==
The Siddha-siddhanta-paddhati (SSP) by Goraksanatha is a key text for the nathayogis. It explores their philosophy, the concept of the Absolute, the universe from their perspective, and the traits of an avadhutayogi.

Goraksanatha rejects the traditional four-class system (caturvarna) of brahmanas, ksatriyas, vaisyas, and sudras, which are defined by their respective qualities of sadācāra - सदाचार (good conduct), śaurya - शौर्य (bravery), vyavasāya - व्यवसाय (trade and commerce), and sevā - सेवा (service). Instead, he introduces sixty-four additional classes based on the practice of sixty-four kalas (arts). As a yogi, he believes in an inclusive order that goes beyond these class distinctions.

sadacara-tattve brahmana vasanti | saurya ksatriyah | vyavasaye vaisyah | seva-bhave sudrah | catuh-sasti-kalasvapi catuh-sasti-varnah ||
Good conduct signifies brahmanas, bravery ksatriyas, trade and commerce vaisyas, service sudras and the sixty-four arts sixty-four (additional) varnas.

— Chapter III: Verse 6

na vidhir-naiva varnas-ca na varjyavarjya-kalpana | na bhedo nidhanam kincin-nasaucam nodaka-kriya ||
yogisvaresvarasyaivam nitya-trptasya yoginah | cit-svatma-sukha-visrantibhava-labdhasya punyatah ||
To an eminent yogi who is ever contented and who has attained the state of bliss of consciousness by his own merit, to that lord of the yogis there are no (binding) injunctions, no (distinction of) varna, no (conception of) prohibition and non-prohibition, no distinction (of any sort), no death or impurity, nor any libation (enjoined).

— Chapter V: Verses 53-54

== Notable Naths ==
- Adityanath – the mahant of the Gorakhnath Math
- Bodhinatha Veylanswami – Sannyasin and Satguru of the Nandinatha Sampradaya
- Gagangiri Maharaj - a yogi of Nath and Datta sampradayas
- Satguru Sivaya Subramuniyaswami – a past guru of the Nandinatha Sampradaya
- Shri Madhavnath Maharaj (1857–1936)
- Kalangi Nathar

== See also ==
- Gurunath – Spiritual title given to a householder Nath Guru
- Sahaja – Spontaneous enlightenment in Indian and Tibetan Buddhism
- Samarasa – Sanskrit term meaning 'one taste'
- Samaveda – Veda of melodies and chants
- Svecchachara – Sanskrit term meaning 'acting as one likes'
- Nath Literature - is an important and distinct branch of medieval Bengali literature.

== Sources ==
- Bagchi, Prabodh Chandra; Magee, Michael (1986). Kaulajnana-nirnaya of the school of Matsyendranatha. Prachya Prakashan.
- Banerjea, Akshaya Kumar (1983). Philosophy of Gorakhnath with Goraksha-Vacana-Sangraha. Motilal Banarsidass. ISBN 978-81-208-0534-7.
- Beck, Guy L. (2012). Alternative Krishnas: Regional and Vernacular Variations on a Hindu Deity. State University of New York Press. ISBN 978-0-7914-8341-1.
- Berntsen, Maxine; Zelliot, Eleanor (1988). The Experience of Hinduism: Essays on Religion in Maharashtra. Albany, N.Y: State University of New York Press. pp. 338. ISBN 0-88706-662-3.
- Boucher, Cathy (n.d.). "The Lineage of Nine Gurus. The Navnath Sampradaya and Sri Nisargadatta Maharaj". Archived from the original on 27 January 2016.
- Briggs (2009) [1938]. Gorakhnath and the Kanphata Yogis (6th ed.). Motilal Banarsidass. p. 229. ISBN 978-8120805644.
- Davisson, Sven (2003). Shri Kapilnath Interview in Ashé: Journal of Experimental Spirituality, Vol. 2, No. 4, Winter 2003.
- Gold, Daniel and Ann Grodzins Gold (1984). The Fate of the Householder Nath in History of Religions, Vol. 24, No. 2 (Nov., 1984), pp. 113–132.
- Harper, Katherine Anne; Brown, Robert L. (2002). The Roots of Tantra. State University of New York Press. ISBN 978-0-7914-5305-6.
- Jones, Constance; Ryan, James D. (2006). Encyclopedia of Hinduism. Infobase Publishing. ISBN 978-0-8160-7564-5.
- Lorenzen, David N. (1978). "Warrior Ascetics in Indian History". Journal of the American Oriental Society. 98 (1): 61–75. doi:10.2307/600151. JSTOR 600151.
- Lorenzen, David N.; Muñoz, Adrián (2011). Yogi Heroes and Poets: Histories and Legends of the Naths. State University of New York Press. ISBN 978-1-4384-3892-4.
- Mallinson, James (2012). ""Nāth Sampradāya"". In Knut A. Jacobsen; Helene Basu; Angelika Malinar; Vasudha Narayanan (eds.). Brill's Encyclopedia of Hinduism. Vol. 3. Brill.
- Mitragotri, Vithal Raghavendra (1999). A socio-cultural history of Goa from the Bhojas to the Vijayanagara. Institute Menezes Braganza.
- Muller-Ortega, Paul E. (2010). Triadic Heart of Siva, The: Kaula Tantricism of Abhinavagupta in the Non-dual Shaivism of Kashmir. State University of New York Press. ISBN 978-1-4384-1385-3.
- Nesbitt, Eleanor (2014). Pashaura Singh; Louis E. Fenech (eds.). The Oxford Handbook of Sikh Studies. Oxford University Press. ISBN 978-0-19-100411-7.
- O'Brien-Kop, Karen; Newcombe, Suzanne (2022). "Siddha Yoga". In Long, Jeffery D. (ed.). Hinduism and Tribal Religions. Springer.
- Pinch, William R. (2006). Warrior Ascetics and Indian Empires. Cambridge University Press. ISBN 978-0-521-85168-8.
- Rigopoulos, Antonio (1998). Dattatreya: The Immortal Guru, Yogin, and Avatara: A Study of the Transformative and Inclusive Character of a Multi-faceted Hindu Deity. State University of New York Press. ISBN 978-0-7914-3696-7.
- Rosen, Richard (2012). Original Yoga: Rediscovering Traditional Practices of Hatha Yoga. Shambhala Publications. ISBN 978-0-8348-2740-0.
- Saran, Prem (2012). Yoga, Bhoga and Ardhanariswara: Individuality, Wellbeing and Gender in Tantra. Routledge. ISBN 978-1-136-51648-1.
- Schomer, Karine; McLeod, W. H. (1987). The Sants: Studies in a Devotional Tradition of India. Motilal Banarsidass. ISBN 978-81-208-0277-3.
- Shukla-Bhatt, Neelima (2015). Narasinha Mehta of Gujarat: A Legacy of Bhakti in Songs and Stories. Oxford University Press. ISBN 978-0-19-997642-3.
- Singleton, Mark (2010). Yoga Body: The Origins of Modern Posture Practice. Oxford University Press. ISBN 978-0-19-974598-2.
- Storl, Wolf-Dieter (2004). Shiva: The Wild God of Power and Ecstasy. Inner Traditions. ISBN 978-1-59477-780-6.
- Thapar, Romila (2008). Somanatha. Penguin Books. ISBN 978-0-14-306468-8.
- White, David Gordon (2012). The Alchemical Body: Siddha Traditions in Medieval India. University of Chicago Press. ISBN 978-0-226-14934-9.
