= Nath literature =

Literary tradition in medieval Bengal

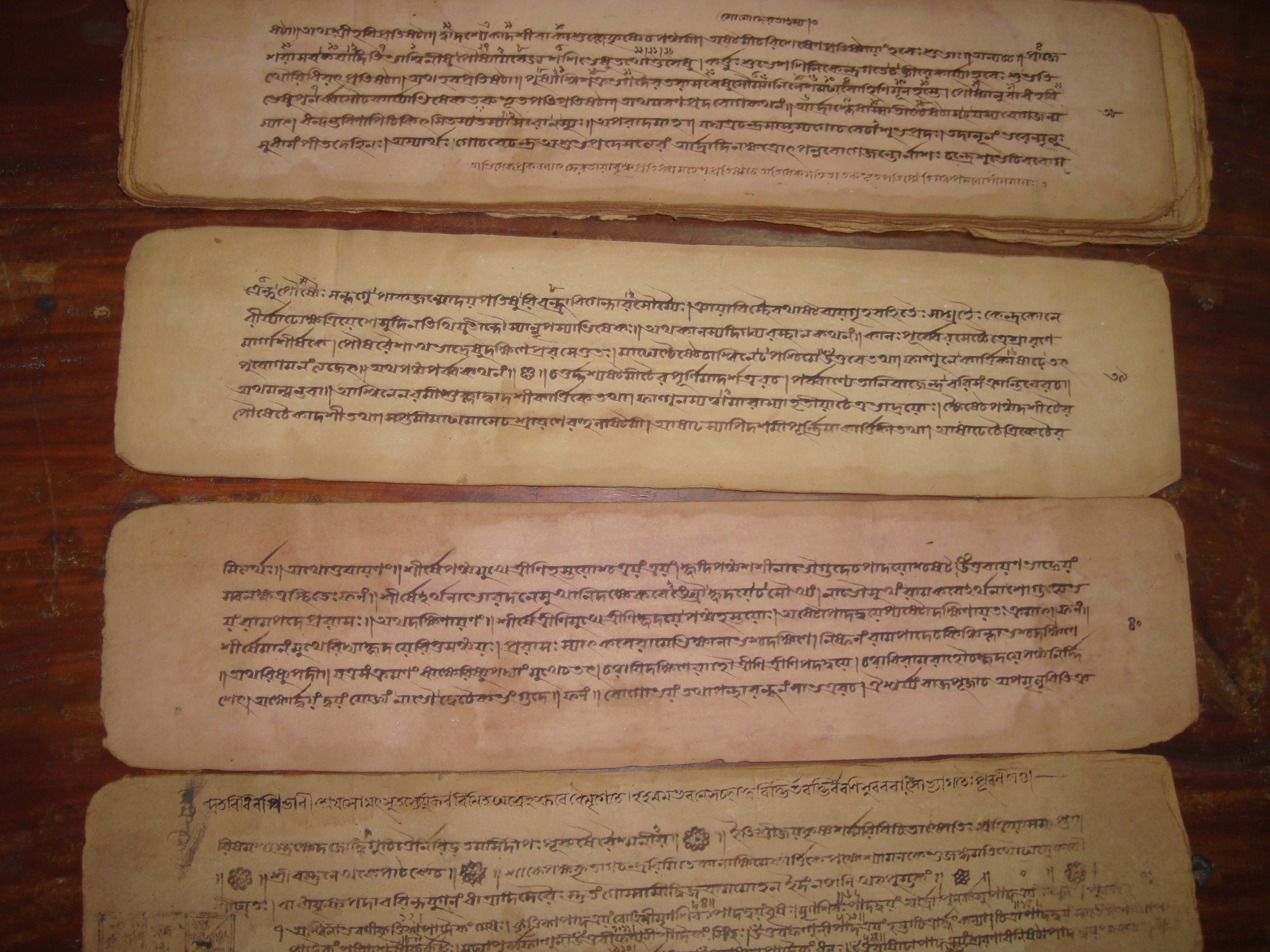
Charyapada manuscript preserved in the library of Rajshahi College.

Nath literature is an important and distinct branch of medieval Bengali literature. It is deeply connected to the spiritual practices, yogic traditions, and guru-centered discipline of the Nath sect. The Nath followers are mainly inspired by yogic ideals; that’s why they are often called 'yogis'. Although there are some differences between Nathism and the simpler beliefs of the Charyapada poets, there are also many fundamental similarities between the two traditions.

From the 10th century onwards, the presence of the Nath sect is seen throughout India. In Bengal's history, the practices, rituals, and religious stories of Nath yogis have been captured in folktales, rhymes, ballads, and folk musics. Especially in northern Bengal and other regions, stories like the songs of Maynamati-Gopichand and tales such as Goraksha Bijoy were widely known among the common people. Most of these literary examples originated between the 10th and 12th centuries. However, over time, new rhymes, songs, and stories were created based on these themes. These later works usually lack the features of ancient language and are instead enriched with local dialects and folk elements.

The influence of Nathism is clear in ancient Bengali literature, such as the Charyapada and Buddhist music and dohas. Both traditions mention Buddhist Siddhacharyas and Nath yogis. Some notable figures include Minanath or Matsyendranath, Jalandharipada or Hadipa, Gorakshanath, and Kanupa or Kanhapada. Although there are some disagreements among scholars about the time periods and locations of these figures, the continuity of their practices and their stories can be found in both types of literature.

Nathism mainly emerged from the fusion of Buddhist Sahajiya, Shaiva philosophy, and the secret disciplines of yoga. Its focus on the guru tradition, spiritual practice, and folk elements contributed to the development of Nath literature. That’s why Nath literature is not just a religious or spiritual expression; it is also an important record of Bengal’s society and culture, rural life, caste system, gender relations, devotion to the guru, and folk traditions. The main pillars of Nathism are yoga, spiritual practice, and devotion to the guru; all these aspects are reflected in its literature. The creation of this literary tradition played a significant role in religious movements, the evolution of folk culture, social changes, and ordinary people’s search for self-realization. Alongside Bengali, many works about the Nath community and their practices have also been created in Hindi, Odia, Marathi, Gujarati, Nepali, and Tibetan.

Bengal’s Nath literature not only illuminated the path of deep spiritual practice but also depicted the realities of society and culture. This literature, formed by the combination of Sahajiya, Buddhist Sahajayana, Shaiva philosophy, and folk traditions, has been enriched for centuries by poets, mystics, and folk artists. Even today, it survives as 'yogi songs' or 'Nath songs' in folk music.

== Branches and features ==
Nath literature mainly developed in two distinct branches, each presenting different aspects of Nath philosophy, practices, and society.

=== Sadhana-guide (practice manuals) ===
The sadhana-guide or guideline-type Nath literature mostly consists of instructional texts for yogis and mystics, focusing on secret practices, philosophy, and devotion to the guru. The main feature of these writings is their use of symbolic and technical terms, cryptic sentences, and mysterious verses or dohas, meant to preserve the secrecy of the practices. These dohas or short verses served as a secret language among practitioners, making them difficult for ordinary people to understand directly. This branch discusses the relationship between teacher and disciple, the doctrine of the body, control of the mind, renunciation, self-restraint, and freedom from worldly attachments. Notable collections include 'Goraksha Samhita' and 'Yogachintamani', which describe methods of spiritual practice, yogic discipline, and the main principles of devotion to the guru. The Charyagitika collection also includes dohas by Nath yogis like Kanhapa and Jalandharipa. Much of this literature was initially oral, passed down by word of mouth before being collected in various anthologies. The verses and teachings attributed to Gorakshanath, Minanath, and others are more reflections of tradition than personal writings.

=== Tales and legends ===
The second and larger branch of Nath literature is the tales and legends, which describe the miraculous lives, practices, falls, liberation, devotion to the guru, renunciation, and struggles of accomplished yogis. This branch was written to attract common people towards the path of religion and to inspire virtues like sacrifice, devotion, moral purity, and ethical behavior. These stories are usually written in verse and were spread through oral tradition. They feature supernatural events, metaphors, drama, and distinct character traits. In Bengali, examples include 'Goraksha Bijoy', 'Manikchandra’s Song', 'Maynamati’s Song', and 'Gopichandra’s Song'. Similar local versions exist in various Indian languages. These stories serve as tales of exemplary character, self-control, loyalty to the guru, freedom from attachments, attainment of spiritual power, and ultimate liberation. As a result, this branch is respected not only as religious literature but also for its role in popular education.

== Important books and stories ==
The most famous tale in Nath literature is 'Goraksha Bijoy'. This story is well-known not only in Bengali but also in other Indian languages. The poem centers on the relationship between teacher and disciple—Minanath and Gorakshanath. It describes Minanath’s fall, Gorakshanath’s miraculous powers, theories about the body, devotion to the guru, and the achievement of spiritual power. In the story, Minanath takes the form of a fish to secretly hear Shiva’s secret knowledge, but later, seduced by a woman, he gets caught up in worldly pleasures in the land of Kadali. His disciple Gorakshanath, disguised as a dancer, comes to free him from this forgetfulness. Ultimately, this tale is a symbol of devotion to the guru and spiritual struggle.

‘Manikchandra’s Song’, ‘Maynamati’s Song’, and ‘Gopichandra’s Song’ are three versions of the same core story, focusing on King Manikchandra and Queen Maynamati’s family life, their turn towards the yogic path, their son Gopichandra’s renunciation, and various events showing loyalty to the guru. Queen Maynamati first urges her husband Manikchandra, and later their son Gopichandra, to give up kingdom, family, and worldly life to embrace the path of renunciation and yoga. The story follows Gopichandra’s departure from home, his discipleship under Guru Hadipa, twelve years of separation from home, many hardships and obstacles, and finally the duel and ultimate renunciation between guru and disciple that leads to spiritual success. Though the language and some details of the story vary by region, the core spirit remains the same.

== Preservation and collections ==
Over time, many Nath stories, manuscripts, and collections have been gathered and edited. About 17 manuscripts of the Goraksha Bijoy story have been collected from undivided Bengal, most of which are partial. Due to the efforts of collectors and editors like Nalini Kanta Bhattasali, Abdul Karim Sahityabisharad, Ali Ahmad, and Panchanan Mandal, many versions of these stories have been preserved. Notable works include 'Meenchetan' edited by Nalini Kanta Bhattasali, and 'Goraksha Bijoy' and 'Gorkha Bijoy' edited by Abdul Karim and Panchanan Mandal. In the case of Maynamati-Gopichandra songs, the names of three poets are mentioned: Durlabh Mallik (Govindachandra Geet), Bhavani Das (Maynamati’s Song), and Shukur Mahmud (Gopichand’s Renunciation). Among these, ‘Gopichand’s Renunciation’ by Shukur Mahmud is considered his best work and a prime example of medieval Bengali poetry. These books have been published and preserved by the Literary Society, Dhaka.

== Literary significance and influence ==
Nath literature is a distinctive branch of Bengali religious literature and folk culture. Alongside spiritual ideas and yogic practices, it also reflects the real life of society and family. The practice-manual branch contains teachings on yoga, philosophy of the body, teacher-disciple relationships, and deep philosophy. The tales and legends depict different social classes, rural culture, caste, gender relations, slavery, educational methods, and folk customs in realistic detail. Through metaphor, it teaches ethics, character building, discipline, self-control, and the ideal of ultimate spiritual success in simple language, which has deeply influenced the minds and social consciousness of ordinary people. Outside Bengal, stories, songs, and verses from Nath literature have been translated and adapted into many languages, blending with local cultures and still surviving in folk traditions. This literature expresses values of non-sectarianism and humanity; Muslim poets have also made significant contributions.

Nath literature is an invaluable treasure of medieval Bengali literature and religious culture. It presents Sahajiya philosophy, yogic teachings, the guru-disciple tradition, and many aspects of society and culture in depth. The mixture of both practice-guides and narrative stories makes this literature multi-dimensional and timeless. It is not just a branch of religious literature, but also an important record of Bengal’s folk life and culture. The popularity of Nath literature survives in many regions even today as 'yogi songs' or 'Nath songs', proving its eternal appeal and tradition.

On this subject, Manindramohan Basu has commented—"In truth, all these religious beliefs originated from the same source, grew with various influences, and became distinctive over time. 'Nath' means 'Sadguru Nath', and this word has also been used in the Charya poems to mean guru... The special doctrines passed down through the line of gurus are the unique features of Nathism.”
