= Paangari =

Village in Maharashtra

- village
- Country: India
- State: Maharashtra

Government
  - Type: gram panchayat
  - Rank: 3rd

Population
  - Total: 5,436
  - Rank: 2

Languages
  - Official: Marathi
- Time zone: UTC+5:30 (IST)
- Vehicle registration: MH 15

Paangari is a village in Sinnar Talkuka of Nashik District, Maharashtra. It is on Mumbai-Shirdi highway and many find it a suitable location for rest during their journey. It is approximately 270 km from Mumbai.
