= Svecchacara =

Sanskrit term meaning 'acting as one likes'

Svecchācāra (IAST; Sanskrit: स्वेच्छाचार) is an important concept in the Nath Sampradaya. 'Svecchācāra' means: acting as one likes, arbitrariness, acting without restraint. The word appears to be a combination of three Sanskrit words: sva (self), iccha (will), and cāra (deportment), essentially adding up to "behaving as one desires" or "in accordance with one's will (iccha)".

John Woodroffe (1951: p. 440) associates it with notions of antinomianism and that it is evident in the Upanishads and Tantras:

"Lastly, the doctrine that the illuminated knower of Brahman (Brahmajnani) is above both good (Dharma) and evil (Adharma) should be noted. Such a one is a Svechacari whose way is Svechacara or "do as you will". Similar doctrine and practices in Europe are there called Antinomianism. The doctrine is not peculiar to the Tantras. It is to be found in the Upanishads, and is in fact a very commonly held doctrine in India."

Woodroffe (1951: pp. 440–441) also goes on to state that:

"In Svecchacara there is theoretical freedom, but it is not consciously availed of to do what is known to be wrong without fall and pollution."

This term is employed in the closure of the Avadhuta Upanishad.

The term 'svecchācāra' also appears nine times in the Mahanirvana Tantra first translated into the English from Sanskrit by Woodroffe (1913).

== See also ==
- True Will
