= Buddhist ethics =

Ethics and code of conduct in Buddhism

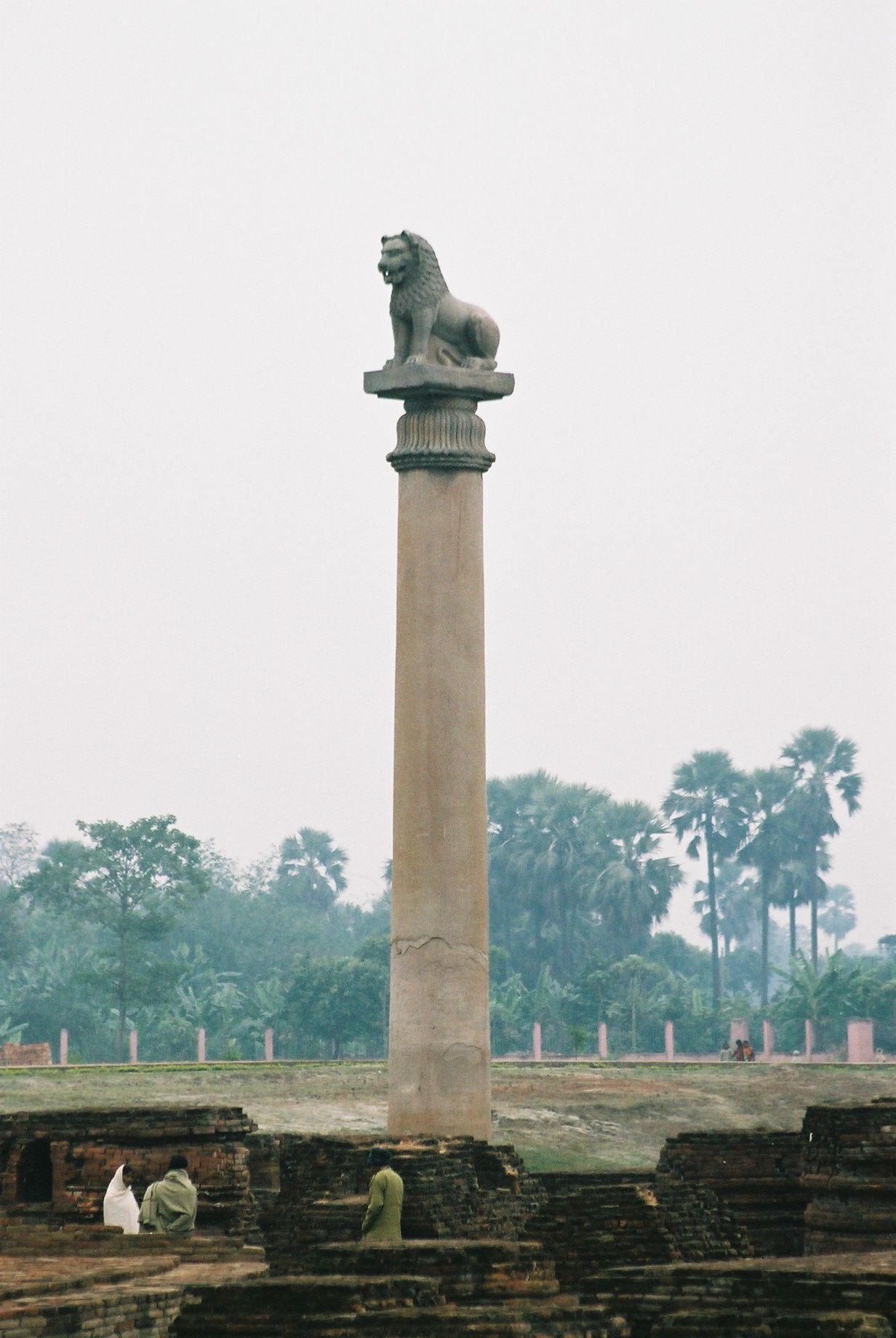
The Buddhist king Ashoka built pillars throughout the Indian subcontinent inscribed with edicts promoting Buddhist moral virtues and precepts.

Buddhist ethics are traditionally based around the enlightened perspective of the Buddha. In Buddhism, ethics or morality are understood by the term śīla (Sanskrit: शील) or sīla (Pāli). Śīla is one of three sections of the Noble Eightfold Path. It is a code of conduct that emulates a natural inborn nature that embraces a commitment to harmony, equanimity, and self-regulation, primarily motivated by nonviolence or freedom from causing harm. It has been variously described as virtue, moral discipline uprightness and precept, skillful conduct. Sīla is one of the three practices foundational to Buddhism and the non-sectarian Vipassana movement; sīla, samādhi, and paññā. It is included within the Theravadin foundations of sīla, dāna, and bhavana. It is also the second pāramitā in Mahayana Buddhism.

Sīla is the wholehearted commitment to what is wholesome that grows with experience of practice. In contrast to the English word "morality" (i.e., obedience, a sense of obligation, and external constraint), Sīla is a resolve to connect with what is believed to be our innate ethical compass. It is an intentional ethical behaviour that is refined and clarified through walking the path toward liberation. Within some traditions, the true adversary is our ignorance, our clinging to beliefs, complexes and our misguided perceptions. As such, behavior is not viewed as good or evil but as skillful or unskillful.

Two aspects of sīla are essential to the training: right "performance" (caritta), and right "avoidance" (varitta). Honoring the precepts of sīla is considered a "great gift" (mahadana) to others because it creates an atmosphere of trust, respect, and security. It means that the practitioner poses no threat to another's life, family, rights, well-being or property.

Moral instructions are included in Buddhist scriptures or handed down through tradition. Most scholars of Buddhist ethics thus rely on the examination of Buddhist scriptures and the use of anthropological evidence from traditional Buddhist societies to justify claims about the nature of Buddhist ethics. While many commonalities exist, there are differences between major Buddhist schools Theravada, Mahāyāna, Vajrayana, and Navayana in regards to texts, emphasis, practices, and ethical outlook.

== Foundations ==
The universal source for Buddhist ethics are the Three Jewels of the Buddha, Dharma and Sangha. The Buddha is seen as the originator of liberating knowledge and hence is the foremost teacher. The Dharma is both the teachings of the Buddha's path and the truths of these teachings. The Sangha is the community of noble ones (ariya) who practice the Dharma and have attained some knowledge, and can thus provide guidance and preserve the teachings. Having proper understanding of the teachings is vital for proper ethical conduct. The Buddha taught that right view, also referred to as right intention and right action, was a necessary prerequisite for right conduct.

=== The Four Noble Truths ===
The Four Noble Truths are at the foundation of Buddhist ethics, particularly in Theravada, and include:

- dukkha (suffering, incapable of satisfying, painful) is an innate characteristic of existence with each rebirth;
- samudaya (origin, cause) of this dukkha is the "craving, desire or attachment";
- nirodha (cessation, ending) of this dukkha can be attained by eliminating all "craving, desire, and attachment";
- magga (path, Noble Eightfold Path) is the means to end this dukkha.

The Four Noble Truths express the central problem motivating Buddhist ethics—the need for liberation from suffering. According to the first Noble Truth, worldly existence is fraught with suffering (dukkha). Dukkha is seen to arise from craving, and putting an end to craving can lead to liberation (Nirvana). Cravings may be foregone by following the Noble Eightfold Path taught by the Buddha, which includes the ethical elements of right speech, right action and right livelihood. From the point of view of the Four Noble Truths, an action is seen as ethical if it is conductive to the elimination of dukkha. Understanding the truth of dukkha in life allows one to analyze the factors for its arising, that is craving, and allows us to feel compassion and empathy for others. By contemplating dukkha as a shared condition of all sentient beings, the practitioner cultivates compassion and seeks to alleviate suffering through wise and skillful action. From the Buddhist perspective, an act is also skillful if it promotes spiritual development by conforming to the Eightfold Path and leading to Nirvana.

Not all Buddhist traditions emphasize the Four Noble Truths equally. In Mahāyāna Buddhism, the focus shifts beyond individual liberation (arhatship) toward universal awakening motivated by loving-kindness and compassion for all beings. Bodhisattvas are believed to work tirelessly for the liberation of all through the Bodhisattva path. Central to this path are the Six (or Ten) Pāramitās: Dāna (generosity), Śīla (ethical conduct), Kṣānti (patience), Vīrya (diligence), Dhyāna (meditation), and Prajñā (wisdom). Mahāyāna also emphasizes key concepts such as emptiness (śūnyatā), interdependence, Buddha-nature, and skillful means (upāya). Core Mahāyāna texts include the Lotus Sūtra, Heart Sūtra, Diamond Sūtra, and Avataṃsaka Sūtra.

=== Karma and rebirth ===
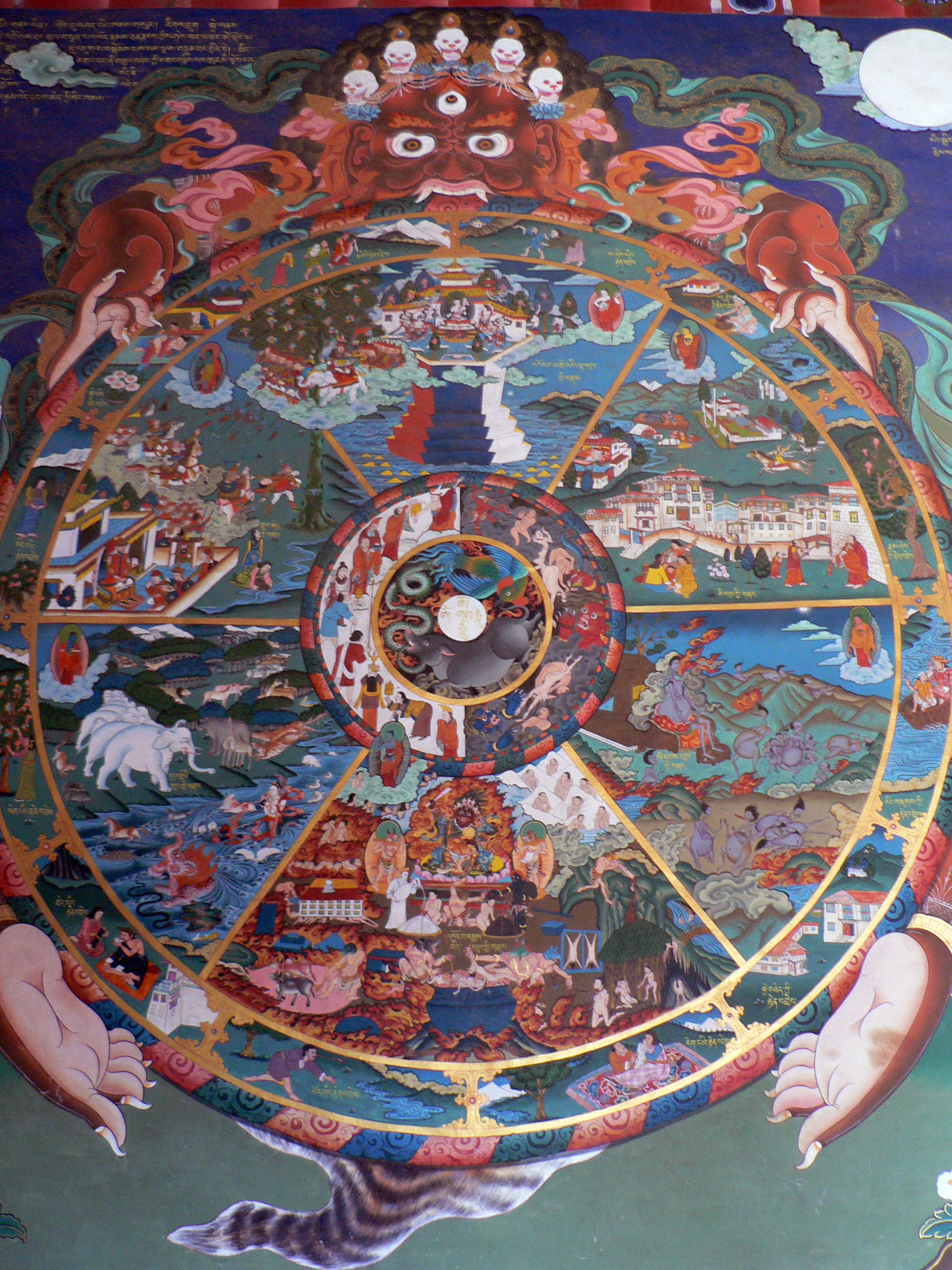
The bhavacakra (wheel of life) shows the realms of karmic rebirth, at its hub are the three poisons of greed, hatred and delusion.

The principle governing suffering and liberation from it is the law of karma, often understood to involve rebirth. Karma literally means "action" and refers to intentional actions. Karma is not fate or supernatural but simply cause and effect, and past karma can be changed by present action including the practice of the eightfold path.

The Buddha is recorded to have stated that right view consisted in believing that (among other things): "'there is fruit and ripening of deeds well done or ill done': what one does matters and has an effect on one's future; 'there is this world, there is a world beyond': this world is not unreal, and one goes on to another world after death" (MN 117, Maha-cattarisaka Sutta). Karma may affect the rebirth of beings and their habits in their next life, though some modern scholars believe Karma can be understood independently of metaphysical doctrines like rebirth.

The core of karma is the mental intention, and hence the Buddha stated "It is intention (cetana), O monks, that I call karma; having willed one acts through body, speech, or mind" (AN 6.63). Therefore, accidentally hurting someone is not bad Karma, but having hurtful thoughts is. Buddhist ethics sees these patterns of motives and actions as conditioning future actions and circumstances – the fruit (Phala) of one's present actions, including the condition and place of the actor's future life circumstances (though these can also be influenced by other random factors). One's past actions are said to mold one's consciousness and to leave seeds (Bīja) which later ripen in the next life. The goal of Buddhist practice is generally to break the cycle, though one can also work for rebirth in a better condition through good deeds.

The root or essence that is the foundation of one's intention is what conditions an action to be skillful or unskillful. There are three good roots (non-attachment, benevolence, and understanding) and three negative roots (greed, hatred and delusion). Actions which produce good outcomes are termed "merit" (puñña – fruitful, auspicious) and obtaining merit (good karma) is an important goal of lay Buddhist practice. The early Buddhist texts mention three 'bases for effecting karmic fruitfulness' (puñña-kiriya-vatthus): giving (dana), moral virtue (sila) and meditation (bhāvanā). One's state of mind while performing good actions is seen as more important than the action itself. The Buddhist Sangha is seen as the most meritorious "field of merit". Negative actions accumulate bad karmic results, though one's regret and attempts to make up for it can ameliorate these results.

=== Precepts ===
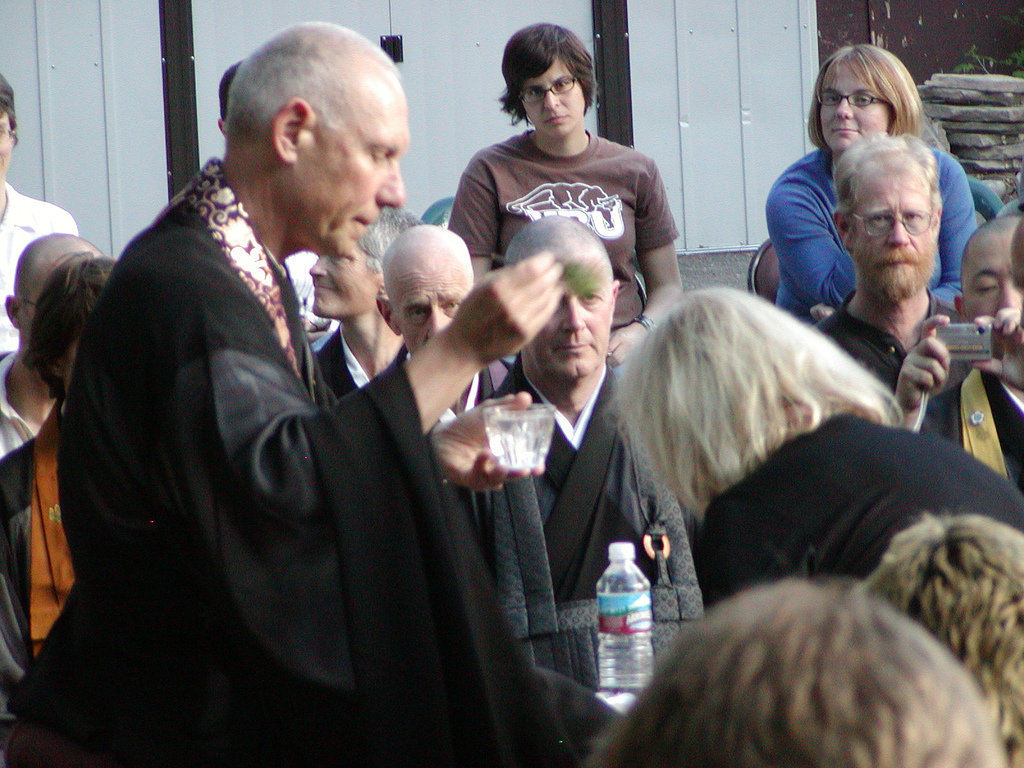
In the Zen Buddhist initiation ceremony of Jukai, initiates take up the Bodhisattva Precepts.

The foundation of Buddhist ethics for laypeople is The Five Precepts which are common to all Buddhist schools. The precepts or "five moral virtues" (pañca-silani) are not commands but a set of voluntary commitments or guidelines, to help one live a life in which one is happy, without worries, and able to meditate well. The precepts are supposed to prevent suffering and to weaken the effects of greed, hatred and delusion. They were the basic moral instructions which the Buddha gave to laypeople and monks alike. Breaking one's sīla as pertains to sexual conduct introduces harmfulness towards one's practice or the practice of another person if it involves uncommitted relationship. When one "goes for refuge" to the Buddha's teachings one formally takes the five precepts, which are:

1. I undertake the training rule to abstain from taking life;
2. I undertake the training rule to abstain from taking what is not given;
3. I undertake the training rule to abstain from sexual misconduct;
4. I undertake the training rule to abstain from false speech;
5. I undertake the training rule to abstain from liquors, wines, and other intoxicants (traditional also the inclusion of acrid herbs and food), which are the basis for heedlessness.

Buddhists often take the precepts in formal ceremonies with members of the monastic Sangha, though they can also be undertaken as private personal commitments. Keeping each precept is said to develop its opposite positive virtue. Abstaining from killing for example develops kindness and compassion, while abstaining from stealing develops non-attachment, honesty and trustworthiness.

The precepts have been connected with utilitarianism, and deontology and virtue approaches to ethics. They have been compared with human rights because of their universal nature.

Undertaking and upholding the five precepts is based on the principle of non-harming (Pāli and Sanskrit: ahiṃsa). The Pali Canon recommends one to compare oneself with others, and on the basis of that, not to hurt others. Compassion and a belief in karma form the foundation of the precepts.

The first precept consists of a prohibition of killing, both humans and all animals. Scholars have interpreted Buddhist texts about the precepts as an opposition to and prohibition of capital punishment, suicide, abortion and euthanasia. The second precept prohibits theft. The third precept refers to adultery in all its forms, and has been defined by modern teachers with terms such as sexual responsibility and long-term commitment. The fourth precept involves falsehood spoken or committed to by action, as well as malicious speech, harsh speech and gossip. The fifth precept prohibits intoxication through alcohol, drugs or other means. Early Buddhist texts nearly always condemn alcohol, and so do Chinese Buddhist post-canonical texts. In practice however, many lay Buddhists do not adhere to this precept and drinking is common in many Buddhist majority countries. Buddhist attitudes toward smoking differ per time and region, but are generally permissive. In modern times, traditional Buddhist countries have seen revival movements to promote the five precepts. As for the West, the precepts play a major role in Buddhist organizations.

There is also a more strict set of precepts called the eight precepts which are taken at specific religious days or religious retreats. The eight precepts encourage further discipline and are modeled on the monastic code. In the eight precepts, the third precept on sexual misconduct is made more strict and becomes a precept of celibacy. The three additional rules of the Eight Precepts are:

6. "I accept the training rule to abstain from food at improper times." (e.g. no solid foods after noon, and not until dawn the following day)
7. "I accept the training rule (a) to abstain from dancing, singing, instrumental music, and shows, and (b) from the use of jewelry, cosmetics, and beauty lotions."
8. "I accept the training rule to abstain from the use of high and luxurious beds and seats."

Novice-monks use the ten precepts while fully ordained Buddhist monks also have a larger set of monastic precepts, called the Prātimokṣa (227 rules for monks in the Theravādin recension). Monks are supposed to be celibate and are also traditionally not allowed to touch money. The rules and code of conduct for monks and nuns is outlined in the Vinaya. The precise content of the scriptures on vinaya (vinayapiṭaka) differ slightly according to different schools, and different schools or subschools set different standards for the degree of adherence to the vinaya.

In Mahayana Buddhism, another common set of moral guidelines are the Bodhisattva vows and the Bodhisattva Precepts or the "Ten Great Precepts". The Bodhisattva Precepts which is derived from the Mahayana Brahmajala Sutra include the Five precepts with some other additions such as the precept against slandering the Buddha's teachings. These exist above and beyond the existing monastic code, or lay follower precepts. The Brahmajala Sutra also includes a list of 48 minor precepts which prohibit the eating of meat, storing of weapons, teaching for the sake of profit, abandoning Mahayana teachings and teaching non Mahayana Dharma. These precepts have no parallel in Theravāda Buddhism.

=== Ten wholesome actions ===
Another common formulation of Buddhist ethical action in the early Buddhist texts is the "path of the ten good actions" or "ten skilled karma paths" (Pali: dasa-kusala-kammapatha, Sanskrit: daśa-kuśala-karmapatha) which are "in accordance with Dharma".

These are divided into three bodily actions (kaya kamma), four verbal actions (vaci kamma) and three mental actions (mano kamma) all of which are said to cause "unskillful qualities to decline while skillful qualities grow". These ten paths are discussed in suttas such as Majjhima Nikaya MN 41 (Sāleyyaka Sutta), and MN 114:

Bodily actions:

1. "Someone gives up killing living creatures", they "renounce the rod and the sword", "They're scrupulous and kind, living full of compassion for all living beings."
2. "They give up stealing. They don't, with the intention to commit theft, take the wealth or belongings of others from village or wilderness."
3. "They give up sexual misconduct. They don't have sexual relations with women who have their mother, father, both mother and father, brother, sister, relatives, or clan as guardian. They don't have sexual relations with a woman who is protected on principle, or who has a husband, or whose violation is punishable by law, or even one who has been garlanded as a token of betrothal."

Verbal actions:

1. "A certain person gives up lying. They're summoned to a council, an assembly, a family meeting, a guild, or to the royal court, and asked to bear witness: 'Please, mister, say what you know.' Not knowing, they say 'I don't know.' Knowing, they say 'I know.' Not seeing, they say 'I don't see.' And seeing, they say 'I see.' So they don't deliberately lie for the sake of themselves or another, or for some trivial worldly reason."
2. "They give up divisive speech. They don't repeat in one place what they heard in another so as to divide people against each other. Instead, they reconcile those who are divided, supporting unity, delighting in harmony, loving harmony, speaking words that promote harmony."
3. "They give up harsh speech. They speak in a way that's mellow, pleasing to the ear, lovely, going to the heart, polite, likable and agreeable to the people."
4. "They give up talking nonsense. Their words are timely, true, and meaningful, in line with the teaching and training. They say things at the right time which are valuable, reasonable, succinct, and beneficial."

Mental actions:

1. "It's when someone is content. They don't covet the wealth and belongings of others: 'Oh, if only their belongings were mine!' They have a kind heart and loving intentions: 'May these sentient beings live free of enmity and ill will, untroubled and happy!'"
2. "It's when someone is content, and lives with their heart full of contentment. They are loving, and live with their heart full of love. They're kind, and live with their heart full of kindness."
3. "It's when someone has such a view: 'There is meaning in giving, sacrifice, and offerings. There are fruits and results of good and bad deeds. There is an afterlife. There are duties to mother and father. There are beings reborn spontaneously. And there are ascetics and brahmins who are well attained and practiced, and who describe the afterlife after realizing it with their own insight.'"

These ten paths are also commonly taught in Mahayana and Vajrayana Buddhism as foundational ethical teachings.

=== Bases of meritorious actions ===
Yet another common ethical list in the Pali tradition is the "ten bases of meritorious action" (Dasa Puñña-kiriya Vatthu). As noted by Nyanatiloka Thera, some texts (Itivuttaka 60) only mention three of these but later Pali commentaries expanded these to ten, and the list of ten is a popular list in Theravada countries. Ittivuttaka #60 says:

Bhikkhus, there are these three grounds for making merit. What three? The ground for making merit consisting in giving, the ground for making merit consisting in virtue, and the ground for making merit consisting in mind-development. These are the three.

One should train in deeds of merit, that yield long-lasting happiness: Generosity, a balanced life, developing a loving mind. By cultivating these three things, deeds yielding happiness, the wise person is reborn in bliss, in an untroubled happy world.

According to Nyanatiloka, Digha Nikaya 30 also mentions several related meritorious behaviors. D.N. 30 mentions various exemplary meritorious actions done by the Buddha such as:

...good conduct by way of body, speech, giving and sharing, taking precepts, observing the Uposatha, paying due respect to mother and father, ascetics and brahmins, honoring the elders in the family, and various other things pertaining to skillful behaviors.

Truth, principle, self-control, and restraint; giving, harmlessness, delighting in non-violence...

giving and helping others, kindly speech, and equal treatment, such action and conduct as brought people together...

The later expanded listing of ten bases is as follows:

- Giving or charity (dāna), This is widely done by giving "the four requisites" to monks; food, clothing, shelter, and medicine. However giving to the needy is also a part of this.
- Morality (sīla), Keeping the five precepts, generally non-harming.
- Mental cultivation (bhāvanā).
- Paying due respect to those who are worthy of it (apacāyana), showing appropriate deference, particularly to the Buddha, Dhamma and Sangha, and to seniors and parents. Usually done by placing the hands together in Añjali Mudrā, and sometimes bowing.
- Helping others perform good deeds (veyyāvacca), looking after others.
- Sharing of merit after doing some good deed (anumodana)
- Rejoicing in the merits of others (pattanumodana), this is common in communal activities.
- Teaching the Dhamma (dhammadesana), the gift of Dhamma is seen as the highest gift.
- Listening to the Dhamma (dhammassavana)
- Straightening one's own views (ditthujukamma)

=== Key values and virtues ===
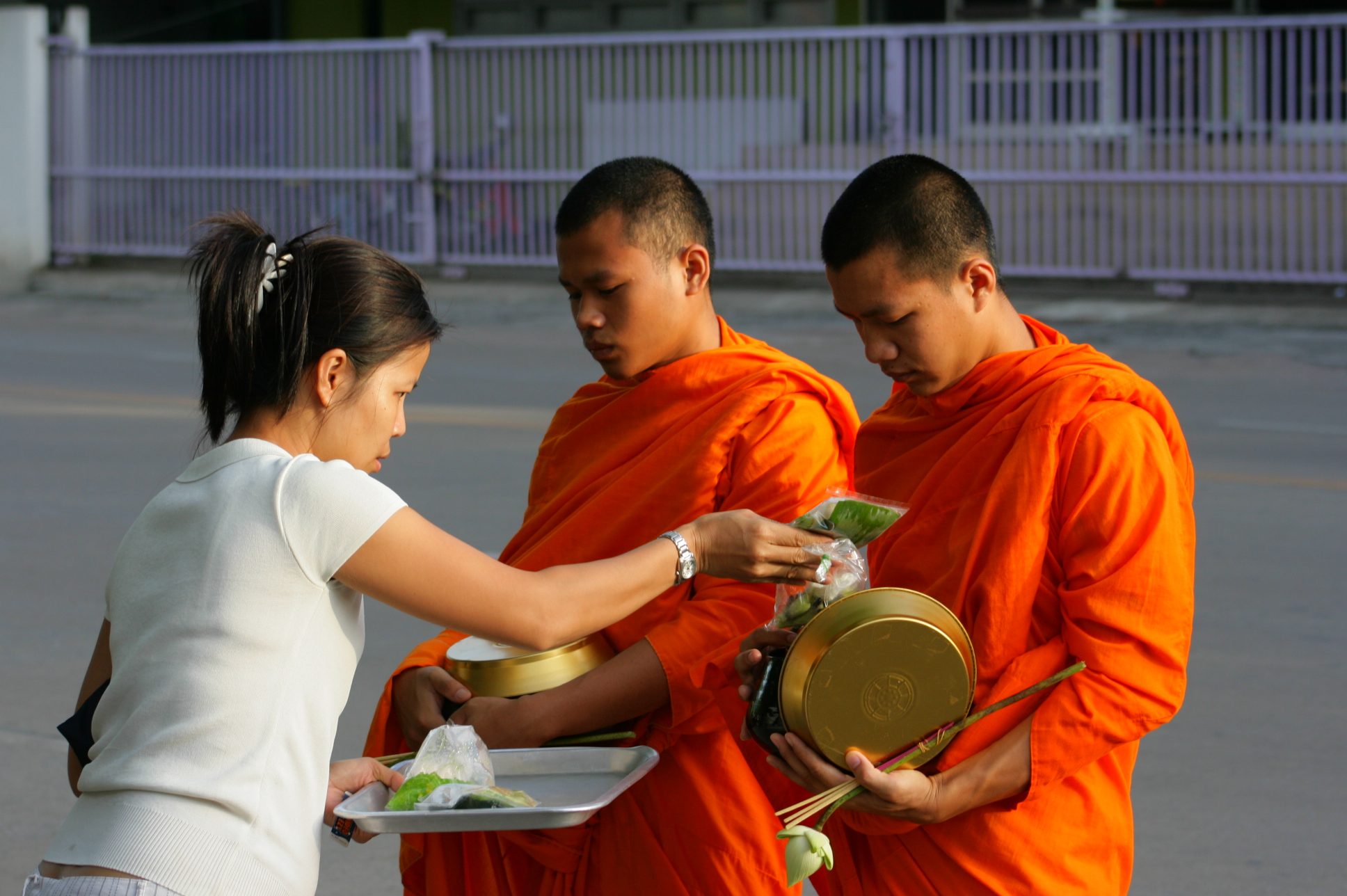
Giving (Dana) is an important Buddhist virtue. The community of monastics is seen as the most meritorious field of karmic fruitfulness.

Following the precepts is not the only dimension of Buddhist morality, there are also several important virtues, motivations and habits which are widely promoted by Buddhist texts and traditions. At the core of these virtues are the three roots of non-attachment (araga), benevolence (advesa), and understanding (amoha).

One list of virtues which is widely promoted in Buddhism are the Pāramitās (perfections) – Dāna (generosity), Sīla (proper conduct), Nekkhamma (renunciation), Paññā (wisdom), Viriya (energy), Khanti (patience), Sacca (honesty), Adhiṭṭhāna (determination), Mettā (Good-Will), Upekkhā (equanimity).

The Four divine abidings (Brahmaviharas) are seen as central virtues and intentions in Buddhist ethics, psychology and meditation. The four divine abidings are good will, compassion, empathetic joy, and equanimity. Developing these virtues through meditation and right action promotes happiness, generates good merit and trains the mind for ethical action.

An important quality which supports right action is Heedfulness (Appamada), a combination of energy/effort (Viriya) and Mindfulness. Mindfulness is an alert presence of mind which allows one to be more aware of what is happening with one's intentional states. Heedfulness is aided by 'clear comprehension' or 'discrimination' (Sampajañña), which gives rise to moral knowledge of what is to be done. Another important supporting quality of Buddhist morality is Trust or Confidence in the teachings of the Buddha and in one's own ability to put them into practice. Wisdom and Understanding are seen as a prerequisite for acting morally. Having an understanding of the true nature of reality is seen as leading to ethical actions. Understanding the truth of not-self for example, allows one to become detached from selfish motivations and therefore allows one to be more altruistic. Having an understanding of the workings of the mind and of the law of karma also makes one less likely to perform an unethical action.

The Buddha promoted 'self-respect' (Hri) and Regard for consequences (Apatrapya), as important virtues. Self-respect is what caused a person to avoid actions which were seen to harm one's integrity and Ottappa is an awareness of the effects of one's actions and sense of embarrassment before others.

Giving (Dāna) is seen as the beginning of virtue in Theravada Buddhism and as the basis for developing further on the path. In Buddhist countries, this is seen in the giving of alms to Buddhist monastics but also extends to generosity in general (towards family, friends, coworkers, guests, animals). Giving is said to make one happy, generate good merit as well as develop non-attachment, therefore it is not just good because it creates good karmic fruits, but it also develops one's spiritual qualities. In Buddhist thought, the cultivation of dana and ethical conduct will themselves refine consciousness to such a level that rebirth in one of the lower hells is unlikely, even if there is no further Buddhist practice. There is nothing improper or un-Buddhist about limiting one's aims to this level of attainment.

An important value in Buddhist ethics is non-harming or non-violence (ahimsa) to all living creatures from the lowest insect to humans which is associated with the first precept of not killing. The Buddhist practice of this does not extend to the extremes exhibited by Jainism (in Buddhism, unintentional killing is not karmically bad), but from both the Buddhist and Jain perspectives, non-violence suggests an intimate involvement with, and relationship to, all living things.

The Buddha also emphasized that 'good friendship (Kalyāṇa-mittatā), good association, good intimacy' was the whole, not the half of the holy life (SN 45.2). Developing strong friendships with good people on the spiritual path is seen as a key aspect of Buddhism and as a key way to support and grow in one's practice.

In Mahayana Buddhism, another important foundation for moral action is the Bodhisattva ideal. Bodhisattvas are beings which have chosen to work towards the salvation of all living beings. In Mahayana Buddhist texts, this path of great compassion is promoted as being superior to that of the Arhat because the Bodhisattva is seen as working for the benefit of all beings. A Bodhisattva is one who arouses a powerful emotion called Bodhicitta (mind of enlightenment) which is a mind which is oriented towards the awakening of oneself and all beings.

== Issues ==
=== Killing ===
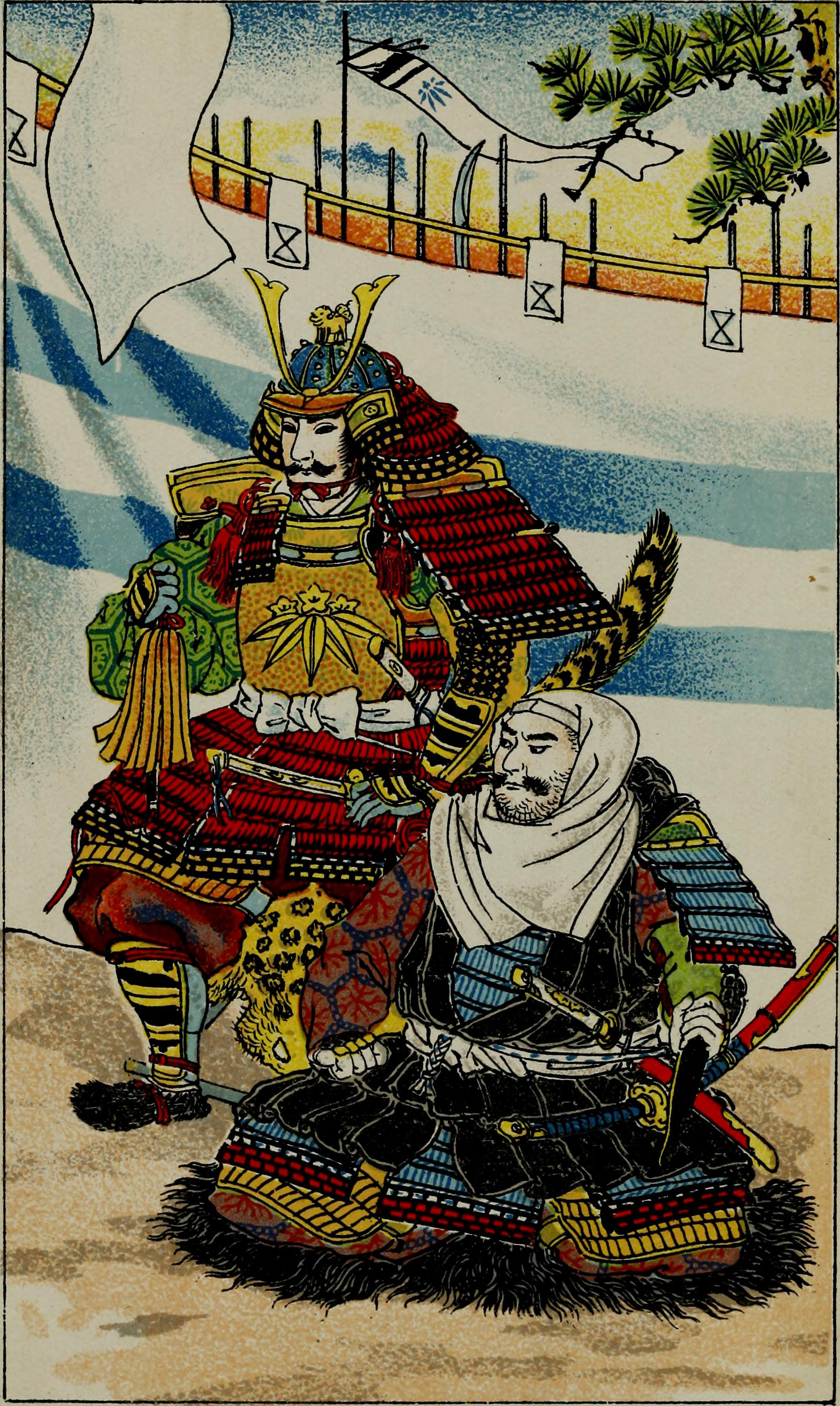
Japanese illustration of Iyo-no-Kami Minamoto Kuro Yoshitsune and Saito Musashi-bo Benkei, the Buddhist warrior monk

The first precept is the abstaining from the taking of life, and the Buddha clearly stated that the taking of human or animal life would lead to negative karmic consequences and was non conductive to liberation. Right livelihood includes not trading in weapons or in hunting and butchering animals. Various suttas state that one should always have a mind filled with compassion and loving kindness for all beings, this is to be extended to hurtful, evil people as in the case of Angulimala the murderer and to every kind of animal, even pests and vermin (monks are not allowed to kill any animal, for any reason). Buddhist teachings and institutions therefore tend to promote peace and compassion, acting as safe havens during times of conflict. In spite of this, some Buddhists, including monastics such as Japanese warrior monks have historically performed acts of violence. In China, the Shaolin Monastery developed a martial arts tradition to defend themselves from attack.

In Mahayana Buddhism, the concept of skillful means (upaya) has in some circumstances been used to excuse the act of killing, if it is being done for compassionate reasons. This form of "compassionate killing" is allowed by the Upaya-kausalya sutra and the Maha-Upaya-kausalya sutra only when it "follows from virtuous thought." Some texts acknowledge the negative karmic consequences of killing, and yet promote it out of compassion. The Bodhisattva-bhumi, a key Mahayana text, states that if a Bodhisattva sees someone about to kill other Bodhisattvas, they may take it upon themselves to kill this murderer with the thought that:

"If I take the life of this sentient being, I myself may be reborn as one of the creatures of hell. Better that I be reborn a creature of hell than that this living being, having committed a deed of immediate retribution, should go straight to hell."

If then, the intention is purely to protect others from evil, the act of killing is sometimes seen as meritorious.

==== War ====
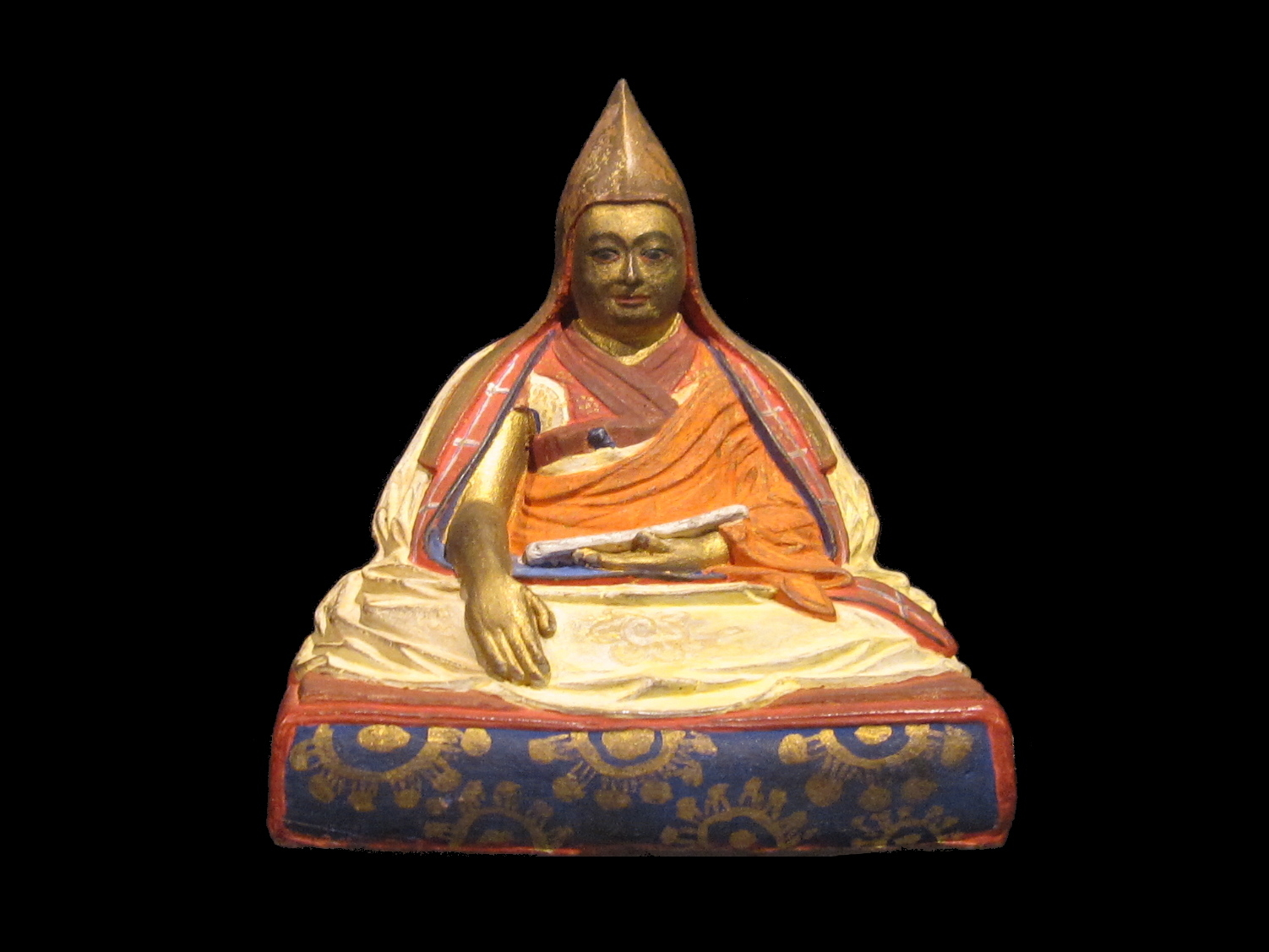
Statue portrait of 5th Dalai Lama

The Buddhist analysis of conflict begins with the 'Three Poisons' of greed, hatred and delusion. Craving and attachment, the cause of suffering, is also the cause of conflict. Buddhist philosopher Shantideva states in his Siksasamuccaya: "Wherever conflict arises among living creatures, the sense of possession is the cause". Craving for material resources as well as grasping to political or religious views is seen as a major source of war. One's attachment to self-identity, and identification with tribe, nation state or religion is also another root of human conflict according to Buddhism.

The Buddha promoted non-violence in various ways, he encouraged his followers not to fight in wars and not to sell or trade weapons. The Buddha stated that in war, both victor and defeated suffer: "The victor begets enmity. The vanquished dwells in sorrow. The tranquil lives happily, abandoning both victory and defeat" (Dhammapada, 201). Buddhist philosopher Candrakīrti wrote that soldiery was not a respectable profession: "the sacrifice of life in battle should not be respected, since this is the basis for harmful actions." The Mahayana Brahmajala Sutra states that those who take the Bodhisattva vows should not take any part in war, watch a battle, procure or store weapons, praise or approve of killers and aid the killing of others in any way. In his Abhidharma-kosa, Vasubandhu writes that all soldiers in an army are guilty of the killing of the army, not just those who perform the actual killing. Historic Buddhists that emphasized peace and dialogue include Ashoka, King Harsha, Vimalakirti, and Prince Shōtoku. Modern Buddhist peace activists include The 14th Dalai Lama, Thich Nhat Hanh, Sulak Sivaraksa, A. T. Ariyaratne, Preah Maha Ghosananda and Nichidatsu Fujii.

While non-violence is central to Buddhism, some Buddhist majority states and kingdoms have waged war throughout history and their leaders and participants have found ways to justify these conflicts. The 5th Dalai Lama who was installed as the head of Buddhism in Tibet by Gushri Khan after the Oirat invasion of Tibet (1635–1642), praised the acts of the Khan and said that he was an emanation of the great Bodhisattva Vajrapani. Under the fifth Dalai Lama and the powerful Gelug Regent Sonam Chophel (1595–1657), treasurer of the Ganden Palace, the Tibetan kingdom launched invasions of Bhutan (c. 1647, ending in failure) and Ladakh (c. 1679, which regained previously lost Tibetan territory) with Mongol aid.

Another example is that of Buddhist warrior monks in feudal Japan who sometimes committed organized acts of war, protecting their territories and attacking rival Buddhist sects. During the late Heian Period, the Tendai school was a particularly powerful sect, whose influential monasteries could wield armies of monks. A key text of this sect was the Mahāyāna Mahāparinirvāṇa Sūtra, which contains passages allowing the use of violence for the defense of the Dharma. The Ashikaga period saw military conflict between the Tendai school, Jōdo Shinshū school and the Nichiren Buddhists. Zen Buddhism was influential among the samurai, and their Bushido code.

During World War II almost all Japanese Buddhists temples strongly supported Japanese imperialism and militarization. The Japanese Pan-Buddhist Society (Myowa Kai) rejected criticism from Chinese Buddhists, stating that "We now have no choice but to exercise the benevolent forcefulness of 'killing one in order that many may live'" (issatsu tashō) and that the war was absolutely necessary to implement the dharma in Asia.

==== Abortion ====
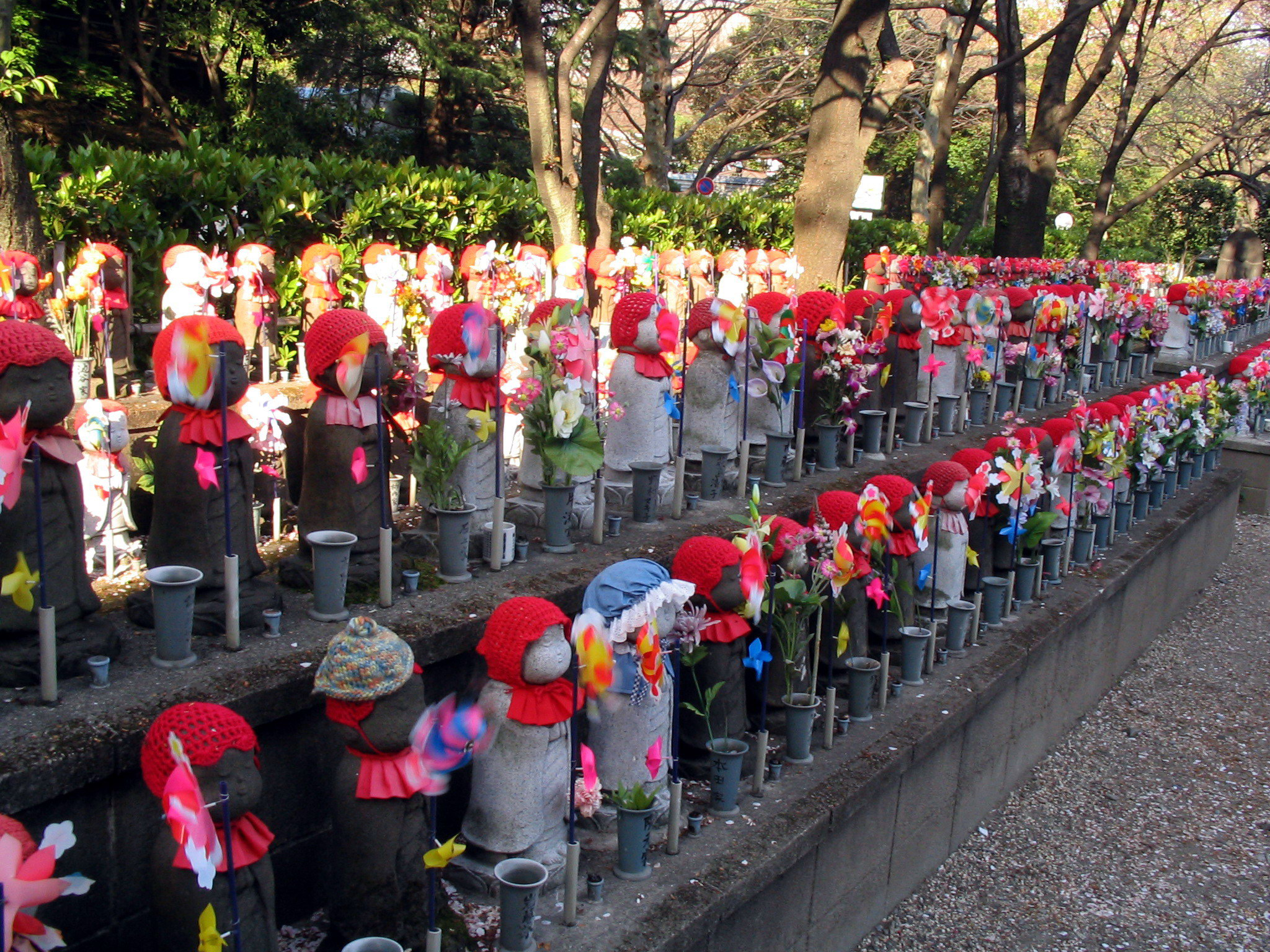
Jizō statues at Zojo-ji temple in Tokyo

There is no single Buddhist view concerning abortion, although traditional Buddhism rejects abortion because it involves the deliberate destroying of a human life and regards human life as starting at conception. Further, some Buddhist views can be interpreted as holding that life exists before conception because of the never ending cycle of life. The traditional Buddhist view of rebirth sees consciousness as present in the embryo at conception, not as developing over time. In the Vinaya (Theravada and Sarvastivada) then, the causing of an abortion is seen as an act of killing punishable by expulsion from the monastic Sangha. The Abhidharma-kosa states that "life is there from the moment of conception and should not be disturbed for it has the right to live".

One of the reasons this is seen as an evil act is because a human rebirth is seen as a precious and unique opportunity to do good deeds and attain liberation. The Jataka stories contain tales of women who perform abortions being reborn in a hell. In the case where the mother's life is in jeopardy, many traditional Buddhists agree that abortion is permissible. This is the only legally permissible reason for abortion in Sri Lanka, and is also a view accepted in the Tibetan tradition, as argued by Ganden Tri Rinpoche. In the case of rape, however, most Buddhists argue that following an act of violence by allowing 'another kind of violence towards another individual' would not be ethical. Aborting a fetus that is malformed is also seen as immoral by most Buddhists.

Those practicing in Japan and the United States are said to be more tolerant of abortion than those who live elsewhere. In Japan, women sometimes participate in Mizuko kuyo (水子供養 — lit. Newborn Baby Memorial Service) after an induced abortion or an abortion as the result of a miscarriage; a similar Taiwanese ritual is called yingling gongyang. In China abortion is also widely practiced, but in Tibet it is very rare. Thus while most Buddhists would agree that abortion is wrong, they are less likely to push for laws banning the practice. The Dalai Lama has said that abortion is "negative", but there are exceptions. He said, "I think abortion should be approved or disapproved according to each circumstance."

While abortion is complicated in Buddhism, contraception is generally accepted.

==== Suicide and euthanasia ====
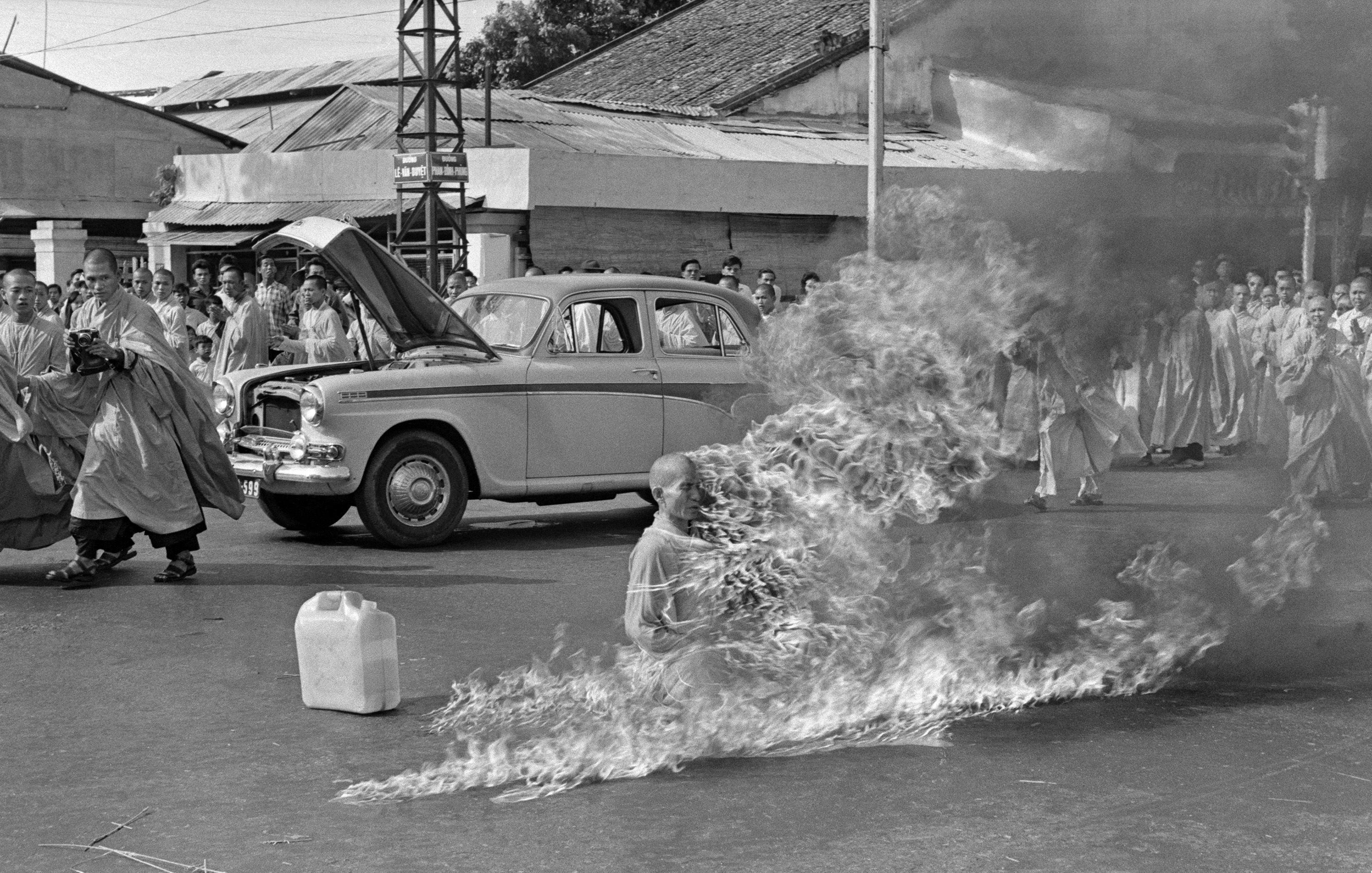
Thích Quảng Đức's self-immolation during the Buddhist crisis

Buddhism understands life as being pervaded by Dukkha, as unsatisfactory and stressful. Ending one's life to escape present suffering is seen as futile because one will be repeatedly reborn. One of the three forms of craving is craving for annihilation (vibhava tanha), and this form of craving is the root of future suffering. Dying with an unwholesome and agitated state of mind is seen as leading to a bad rebirth, so suicide is seen as creating negative karma. Ending one's life is also seen as throwing away the precious opportunity to generate positive karma. While suicide does not seem to be interpreted as a breaking of the first precept (not killing other beings) it is still seen as a grave and unwholesome action.

In Theravada Buddhism, for a monk to praise the advantages of death, including simply telling a person of the miseries of life or the bliss of dying and going to heaven in such a way that he/she might feel inspired to commit suicide or simply pine away to death, is explicitly stated as a breach in one of highest vinaya codes regarding the prohibition of harming life, hence it will result in automatic expulsion from Sangha.

Buddhism sees the experience of dying as a very sensitive moment in one's spiritual life, because the quality of one's mind at the time of death is believed to condition one's future rebirth. The Buddhist ideal is to die in a calm but conscious state, while learning to let go. Dying consciously, without negative thoughts but rather joyously with good thoughts in mind is seen as a good transition into the next life. Chanting and reciting Buddhist texts is a common practice; in Tibet the Bardo Thodol is used to guide the dying to a good rebirth.

Traditional Buddhism would hold euthanasia, where one brings about the death of a suffering patient (whether or not they desire this) so as to prevent further pain, as a breach of the first precept. The argument that such a killing is an act of compassion because it prevents suffering is unacceptable to traditional Buddhist theology because it is seen to be deeply rooted in delusion. This is because the suffering being who was euthanized would be reborn and having to suffer due to their karma (even though not all suffering is due to karma), and hence killing them does not help them escape suffering. The Abhidharma-kosa clearly states that the killing of one's sick and aged parents is an act of delusion. The act of killing someone in the process of death also ruins their chance to mindfully experience pain and learn to let go of the body, hence desire for euthanasia would be a form of aversion to physical pain and a craving for non-becoming. According to Kalu Rinpoche however, choosing to be removed from life support is karmically neutral. The choice not to receive medical treatment when one is terminally ill is then not seen as morally reprehensible, as long as it does not arise from a feeling of aversion to life. This would also apply to not resuscitating a terminal patient.

However, there are exceptions to the injunction against suicide. Several Pali suttas contain stories where self-euthanizing is not seen as unethical by the Buddha, showing that the issue is more complex. These exceptions, such as the story of the monk Channa and that of the monk Vakkali, typically deal with advanced Buddhist practitioners. In these exceptional cases, both Channa and Vakkali are both said to be enlightened arhats and euthanized themselves in a calm and detached state of mind.

In East-Asian and Tibetan Buddhism, the practice of self-immolation developed. In China, the first recorded self-immolation was by the monk Fayu (d. 396). According to James A. Benn, this tended to be much more common during times of social and political turmoil and Buddhist persecution. It was often interpreted in Buddhist terms as a practice of heroic renunciation. This practice was widely publicized during the Vietnam War and have also continued as a form of protest by Tibetans against the Chinese government.

==== Capital punishment ====
Buddhism places great emphasis on the ethical precept against killing and therefore the death penalty would be a violation of Buddhist ethics. The first of the Five Precepts (Panca-sila) is to abstain from destruction of life.

Chapter 10 of the Dhammapada states:

"Everyone fears punishment; everyone fears death, just as you do. Therefore do not kill or cause to kill. Everyone fears punishment; everyone loves life, as you do. Therefore do not kill or cause to kill".

Chapter 26, the final chapter of the Dhammapada, states "Him I call a brahmin who has put aside weapons and renounced violence toward all creatures. He neither kills nor helps others to kill". These sentences are interpreted by many Buddhists as an injunction against supporting any legal measure which might lead to the death penalty. Historically, many Buddhists opposed the death penalty including Nāgārjuna who advised King Udayi to treat criminals with compassion.

However, throughout history, many countries where Buddhism has been the official religion have had their leaders enforce the death penalty. One exception is the abolition of the death penalty by the Emperor Saga of Japan in 818. This lasted until 1165, although in private manors executions conducted as a form of retaliation continued to be performed.

==== Justice ====
In Buddhist ethics, justice is not defined by individuals "receiving their due," as in some frameworks, but by the transformation of suffering for all sentient beings by addressing their ignorance and leading them to enlightenment with skillful actions rooted in generosity, virtue, and the development of universal goodwill and compassion. The concept of karma is understood not as a system of rewards and punishments, but as the continuation of actions, thoughts, and intentions that shape future experience within an interconnected web of life. Central to this view are the principles of all beings having Buddha nature, interbeing with a deep interdependence of all things, dependent origination, which states phenomena arise in dependence upon other phenomena, and non-duality, which challenges rigid distinctions between self and other, or right and wrong as fixed absolutes. Justice, from this perspective, does not consist of assigning blame or enforcing penalties, but of recognizing shared responsibility and cultivating compassion, mindfulness, and understanding that leads beings to enlightenment and a Buddhist form of restorative justice. The notion that individuals inherently deserve either suffering or reward is often critiqued as a misinterpretation of karma that reinforces ego and separation. Instead, Buddhist justice emphasizes developing compassion, reducing suffering for all sentient beings, and supporting conditions that can lead beings to enlightenment. This restorative and transformative orientation contrasts with retributive models focused on individual deserts, offering a vision of justice rooted in collective liberation rather than reparation.

=== Animals and the environment ===
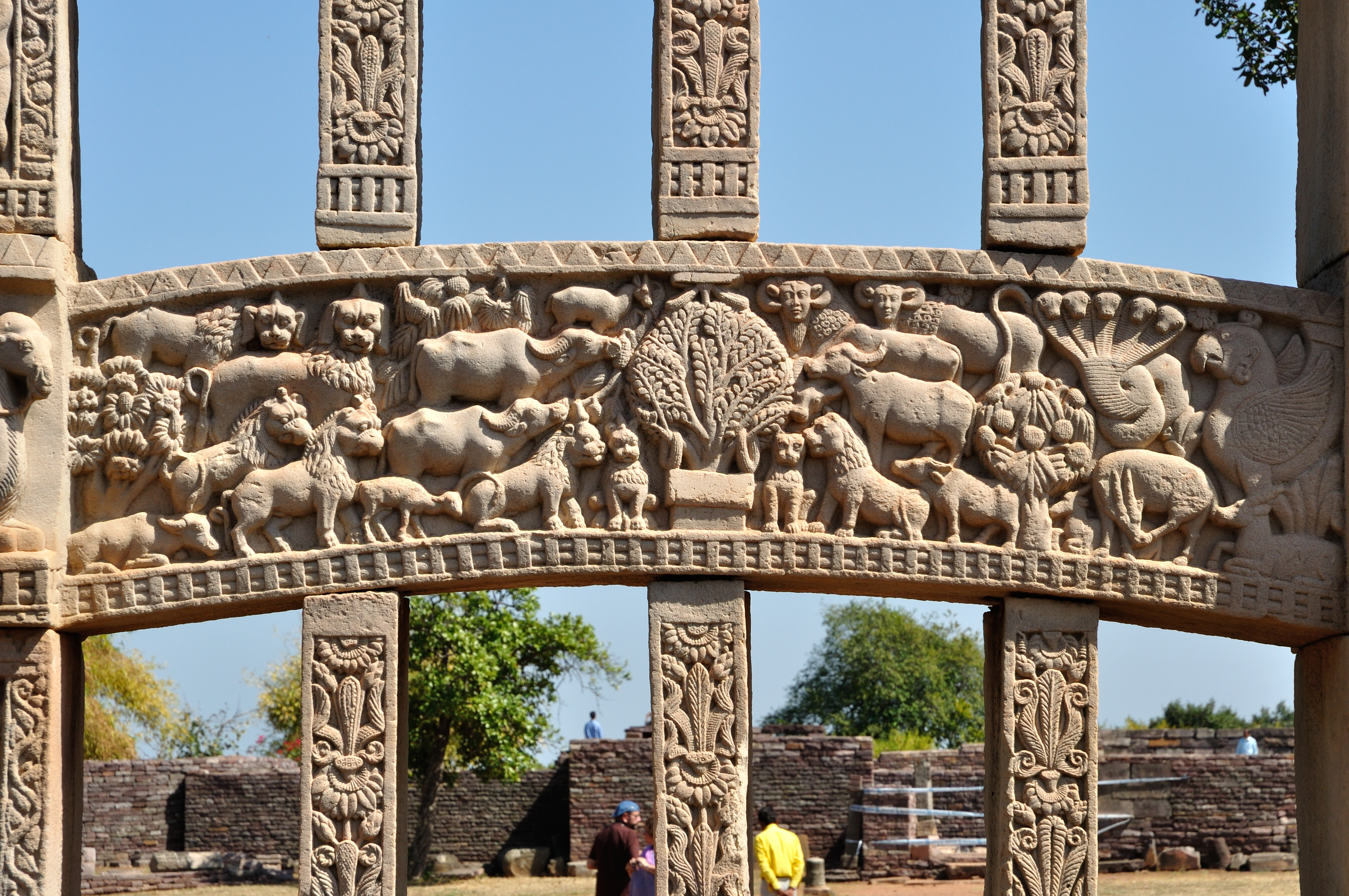
The Buddha, represented by the Bodhi tree, attended by animals, Sanchi vihara

Buddhism does not see humans as being in a special moral category over animals or as having any kind of God given dominion over them as Christianity does. Humans are seen as being more able to make moral choices, and this means that they should protect and be kind to animals who are also suffering beings who are living in samsara. Buddhism also sees humans as part of nature, not as separate from it. Thich Nhat Hanh summarizes the Buddhist view of harmony with nature thus:

We classify other animals and living beings as nature, acting as if we ourselves are not part of it. Then we pose the question 'How should we deal with Nature?' We should deal with nature the way we should deal with ourselves! We should not harm ourselves; we should not harm nature...Human beings and nature are inseparable.

Early Buddhist monastics spent a lot of time in the forests, which was seen as an excellent place for meditation and this tradition continues to be practiced by the monks of the Thai Forest Tradition.

==== Vegetarianism ====
There is a divergence of views within Buddhism on the need for vegetarianism, with some schools of Buddhism rejecting such a claimed need and with most Buddhists in fact eating meat. Many Mahayana Buddhists – especially the Chinese, Vietnamese and most Korean traditions – strongly oppose meat-eating on scriptural and ethical grounds.

The first precept of Buddhism focuses mainly on direct participation in the destruction of life. This is one reason that the Buddha made a distinction between killing animals and eating meat, and refused to introduce vegetarianism into monastic practice. While early Buddhist texts like the Pali Canon frown upon hunting, butchering, fishing and 'trading in flesh' (meat or livestock) as professions, they do not ban the act of eating meat. Direct participation also includes ordering or encouraging someone to kill an animal for you.

The Buddhist king Ashoka promoted vegetarian diets and attempted to decrease the number of animals killed for food in his kingdom by introducing 'no slaughter days' during the year. He gave up hunting trips, banned the killing of specific animals and decreased the use of meat in the royal household. Ashoka even banned the killing of some vermin or pests. His example was followed by later Sri Lankan kings. One of Ashoka's rock edicts states:

Here (in my domain) no living beings are to be slaughtered or offered in sacrifice...Formerly, in the kitchen of Beloved-of-the-Gods, King Piyadasi, hundreds of thousands of animals were killed every day to make curry. But now with the writing of this Dhamma edict only three creatures, two peacocks and a deer are killed, and the deer not always. And in time, not even these three creatures will be killed.

Many Buddhists, especially in East Asia, believe that Buddhism advocates or promotes vegetarianism. While Buddhist theory tends to equate killing animals with killing people (and avoids the conclusion that killing can sometimes be ethical, e.g. defense of others), outside of the Chinese, Korean, Vietnamese and some Japanese monastic traditions, most Buddhists do eat meat in practice; there is however, a significant minority of Buddhist laypersons in the aforementioned traditions that maintain vegetarianism on a set schedule and a smaller minority who are full-time Buddhist vegetarians. There is some controversy surrounding whether or not the Buddha himself died from eating rancid pork or mushroom. While most Chinese and Vietnamese monastics are vegetarian, vegetarian Tibetans are rare, due to the harsh Himalayan climate. Japanese lay people tend to eat meat, but monasteries tend to be vegetarian. The Dalai Lama, after contracting hepatitis B, was advised by doctors to switch to a high animal-protein diet. The current Dalai Lama eats vegetarian every second day, so he effectively eats a vegetarian diet for six months of the year. In the West, vegetarianism among Buddhists is also common.

In the Pali version of the Tripitaka, there are number of occasions in which the Buddha ate meat as well as recommending certain types of meat as a cure for medical conditions. On one occasion, a general sent a servant to purchase meat specifically to feed the Buddha. The Buddha declared that:

Meat should not be eaten under three circumstances: when it is seen or heard or suspected (that a living being has been purposely slaughtered for the eater); these, Jivaka, are the three circumstances in which meat should not be eaten, Jivaka! I declare there are three circumstances in which meat can be eaten: when it is not seen or heard or suspected (that a living being has been purposely slaughtered for the eater); Jivaka, I say these are the three circumstances in which meat can be eaten.

— Jivaka Sutta

The Buddha held that because the food is given by a donor with good intentions, a monk should accept this as long as it is pure in these three respects. To refuse the offering would deprive the donor of the positive karma that giving provides. Moreover, it would create a certain conceit in the monks who would now pick and choose what food to eat. The Buddha did state however that the donor does generate bad karma for himself by killing an animal. In Theravada Buddhist countries, most people do eat meat, however.

While there is no mention of Buddha endorsing or repudiating vegetarianism in surviving portions of Pali Tripitaka and no Mahayana sutras explicitly declare that meat eating violates the first precept, certain Mahayana sutras vigorously and unreservedly denounce the eating of meat, mainly on the ground that such an act violates the bodhisattva's compassion. The sutras which inveigh against meat-eating include the Mahayana version of the Nirvana Sutra, the Shurangama Sutra, the Brahmajala Sutra, the Angulimaliya Sutra, the Mahamegha Sutra, and the Lankavatara Sutra, as well as the Buddha's comments on the negative karmic effects of meat consumption in the Karma Sutra. In the Mahayana Mahaparinirvana Sutra, which presents itself as the final elucidatory and definitive Mahayana teachings of the Buddha on the very eve of his death, the Buddha states that "the eating of meat extinguishes the seed of Great Kindness", adding that all and every kind of meat and fish consumption (even of animals found already dead) is prohibited by him. He specifically rejects the idea that monks who go out begging and receive meat from a donor should eat it: "... it should be rejected ... I say that even meat, fish, game, dried hooves and scraps of meat left over by others constitutes an infraction ... I teach the harm arising from meat-eating." The Buddha also predicts in this sutra that later monks will "hold spurious writings to be the authentic Dharma" and will concoct their own sutras and lyingly claim that the Buddha allows the eating of meat, whereas in fact he says he does not. A long passage in the Lankavatara Sutra shows the Buddha speaking out very forcefully against meat consumption and unequivocally in favor of vegetarianism, since the eating of the flesh of fellow sentient beings is said by him to be incompatible with the compassion that a Bodhisattva should strive to cultivate. In several other Mahayana scriptures, too (e.g., the Mahayana jatakas), the Buddha is seen clearly to indicate that meat-eating is undesirable and karmically unwholesome.

==== Environment ====
Forests and jungles represented the ideal dwelling place for early Buddhists, and many texts praise the forest life as being helpful to meditation. Monks are not allowed to cut down trees as per the Vinaya, and the planting of trees and plants is seen as karmically fruitful. Because of this, Buddhist monasteries are often small nature preserves within the modernizing states in East Asia. The species Ficus religiosa is seen as auspicious, because it is the same kind of tree that the Buddha gained enlightenment under.

In Mahayana Buddhism, some teachings hold that trees and plants have Buddha nature. Kukai held that plants and trees, along with rocks and everything else, were manifestations of the 'One Mind' of Vairocana and Dogen held that plant life was Buddha nature.

In pre-modern times, environmental issues were not widely discussed, though Ashoka banned the burning of forests and promoted the planting of trees in his edicts. Bhikkhu Bodhi, an American Theravada monk, has been outspoken about the issue of environmental crisis. Bodhi holds that the root of the current ecological crisis is the belief that increased production and consumption to satisfy our material and sensual desires leads to well-being. The subjugation of nature is directly opposed to the Buddhist view of non-harming and dwelling in nature. Buddhist activists such as Ajahn Pongsak in Thailand and the Sarvodaya Shramadana Movement have worked for reforestation and environmental protection. The Dalai Lama also professes the close relationship of human beings and nature, saying that since humans come from nature, there is no point in going against it. He advocates that a clean environment should be considered a basic human right and that it is our responsibility as humans to ensure that we do all we can to pass on a healthy world to those who come after us.

=== Gender issues ===
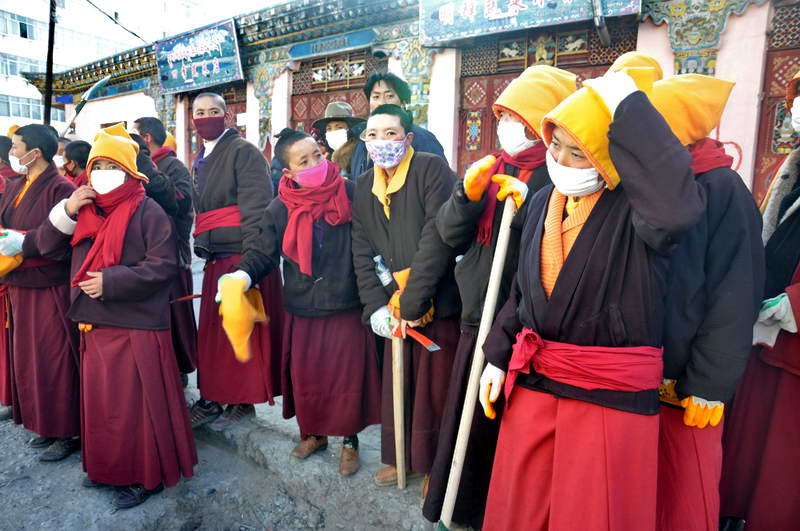
Buddhist nuns from the Tibetan tradition, volunteering in Kyegundo (Tibet Earthquake zone)

In pre-Buddhist Indian religion, women were seen as inferior and subservient to men. Buddha's teachings tended to promote gender equality as the Buddha held that women had the same spiritual capacities as men did. According to Isaline Blew Horner, women in Buddhist India: "commanded more respect and ranked as individuals. They enjoyed more independence, and a wider liberty to guide and follow their own lives." Buddha gave the same teachings to both sexes, praised various female lay disciples for their wisdom and allowed women to become monastics (Bhikkhunis) at a time when this was seen as scandalous in India, where men dominated the spiritual professions. The two chief female disciples of the Buddha were Khema and Uppalavanna. The Buddha taught that women had the same soteriological potential as men, and that gender had no influence on one's ability to advance spiritually to nirvana. In the early Buddhist texts, female enlightened Arhats are common. Buddhist nuns are however bound by an extra 8 precepts not applicable to Buddhist monks called The Eight Garudhammas. The authenticity of these rules is highly contested; they were supposedly added to the (bhikkhunis) Vinaya "to allow more acceptance" of a monastic Order for women, during the Buddha's time but can be interpreted as a form of gender discrimination. Alan Sponberg argues that the early Buddhist sangha sought social acceptance through 'institutional androcentrism' as it was dependent on material support from lay society. Because of this Sponberg concludes: "For all its commitment to inclusiveness at the doctrinal level, institutional Buddhism was not able to (or saw no reason to) challenge prevailing attitudes about gender roles in society." The pre-Mahayana texts also state that while women can become Arhats, they cannot become a Samyaksambuddha (a Buddha who discovers the path by himself), Chakravartins (Wheel turning king), a Ruler of heaven, a Mara devil or a Brahama god.

The Therigatha is a collection of poems from elder Buddhist nuns, and one of the earliest texts of women's literature. Another important text is the Therī-Apadāna, which collects the biographies of eminent nuns. One such verses are those of the nun Soma, who was tempted by Mara when traveling in the woods. Mara states that women are not intelligent enough to attain enlightenment, Soma replies with a verse which indicates the insignificance of gender to spirituality:

"What does womanhood matter at all
When the mind is concentrated well,
When knowledge flows on steadily
As one sees correctly into Dhamma.
One to whom it might occur,
'I'm a woman' or 'I'm a man'
Or 'I'm anything at all' —
Is fit for Mara to address."

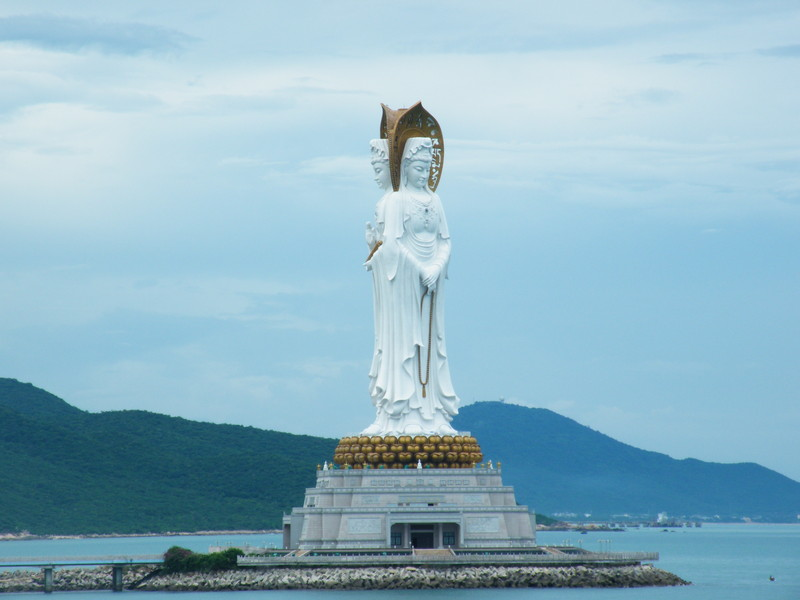
The Guan Yin of the South Sea of Sanya is the largest statue of a woman in the world.

In Mahayana Buddhism, Bodhisattvas such as Tara and Guanyin are very popular female deities. Some Buddhist Tantric texts include female consorts for each heavenly Buddha or Bodhisattva. In these Tantric couples, the female symbolizes wisdom (prajna) and the male symbolizes skillful means (upaya). The union of these two qualities is often depicted as sexual union, known as yab-yum (father-mother).

In East Asia, the idea of Buddha nature being inherent in all beings is taken to mean that, spiritually at least, the sexes are equal, and this is expressed by the Lion's Roar of Queen Srimala sutra. Based on this ideal of Buddha nature, the Chinese Chan (Zen) school emphasized the equality of the sexes. Dahui Zonggao (1089–1163) of the Chinese Linji school said of women in Buddhism: "For mastering the truth, it does not matter whether one is male or female, noble or base." The Japanese founder of Soto Zen, Dogen wrote: "If you wish to hear the Dharma and put an end to pain and turmoil, forget about such things as male and female. As long as delusions have not yet been eliminated, neither men nor women have eliminated them; when they are all eliminated and true reality is experienced, there is no distinction of male and female."

The attitude of Buddhists towards gender has been varied throughout history as it has been influenced by each particular culture and belief system such as Confucianism (which sees women as subservient) and Hinduism. The Theravadin commentator Buddhaghosa (5th century CE) for example, seems to have been influenced by his Brahmin background in stating that rebirth as a male is higher than rebirth as a female. Some Mahayana sutras such as the 'Sutra on Changing the Female Sex' and the 'Questions of the Daughter Pure Faith' also echo this idea. For various historical and cultural reasons such as wars and invasions, the orders of ordained Buddhist nuns disappeared or was never introduced in Southeast Asia and Tibet, though they slowly started being reintroduced by nuns such as Ayya Khema, Dhammananda Bhikkhuni, Tenzin Palmo and Thubten Chodron. Until very recently, China, Taiwan and Korea were the only places where fully ordained bhiksuni lineages still existed. An international conference of Buddhist nuns was held in February 1987 at Bodh Gaya and saw the formation of 'Sakyadhita' (Daughters of the Buddha) the International Association of Buddhist Women which focuses on helping Buddhist nuns throughout the world.

=== Relationships ===
The Buddha placed much importance on the cultivation of good will and compassion towards one's parents, spouse, friends and all other beings. Buddhism strongly values harmony in the family and community. Keeping the five precepts and having a generous attitude (Dana) is seen as the foundation for this harmony. An important text, seen as the lay people's Vinaya (code of conduct) is the Sigalovada Sutta which outlines wrong action and warns against the squandering of wealth. The Sigalovada Sutta outlines how a virtuous person "worships the six directions" which are parents (East), teachers (South), wife (West), and friends and colleagues (North), and the two vertical directions as: ascetics and Brahmins (Up) and the Servants (Down). The text elaborates on how to respect and support them, and how in turn the Six will return the kindness and support. The relationships are based on reciprocation, and it is understood one has no right to expect behavior from others unless one also performs good acts in his favor.

Parents for example, are to be respected and supported with the understanding that they are to have provided care and affection to oneself. In marriage, the sutta states that a householder should treat his wife by "being courteous to her, by not despising her, by being faithful to her, by handing over authority to her, by providing her with adornments." while in return the wife "performs her duties well, she is hospitable to relations and attendants, she is faithful, she protects what he brings, she is skilled and industrious in discharging her duties." The Buddha also stated that a wife and husband are to be each other's best friend (parama sakha). While monogamy is the predominant model for marriage, Buddhist societies have also practiced and accepted polygamy and polyandry. Buddhism sees marriage not as sacred but as a secular partnership and hence has no issue with divorce.

=== Sexuality ===
The Third (or sometimes Fourth) of the Five Precepts of Buddhism states that one is to refrain from "sexual misconduct", which has various interpretations, but generally entails any sexual conduct which is harmful to others, such as rape, molestation and often adultery, although this depends on the local marriage and relationship customs. Buddhist monks and nuns of most traditions are not only expected to refrain from all sexual activity but also take vows of celibacy.

==== Sexual orientation ====
Among the Buddhist traditions there is a vast diversity of opinion about homosexuality, and in interpreting the precedents which define "sexual misconduct" generally. Though there is no explicit condemnation of homosexuality or same-gender romantic relationships in Buddhist sutras, be it Theravada, Mahayana or Mantrayana, societal and community attitudes and the historical view of practitioners have established precedents. According to the Pāli Canon and Āgama (the Early Buddhist scriptures), there is no saying that same or opposite gender relations have anything to do with sexual misconduct,

Some sangha equate homosexuality with scriptural sexual misconduct prohibited by the Five Precepts. Other sangha hold that if sexuality is compassionate and/or consensual and does not contravene vows, then there is no karmic infraction, irrespective of whether it is same-sex or not.

Some Theravada monks express that same-gender relations do not violate the rule to avoid sexual misconduct, which means not having sex with someone underage (thus protected by their parents or guardians), someone betrothed or married and who have taken vows of religious celibacy.

Buddhist communities in Western states as well as in Japan generally tend to be accepting of homosexuality. In Japan, homosexual relations among Buddhist samurai and clergy were actually quite common. Male homosexuality between clergy was especially common in the Tantric Shingon school.

Some later traditions, like Shantideva and Gampopa, feature restrictions on non-vaginal sex (including homosexuality). A medieval commentary of the Digha Nikaya mentions examples of immorality in society, and one of the examples is homosexuality, whereas this has no basis in the Sutta. Other Buddhist texts such as the Abhidharma-kosa and the Jataka tales make no mention of homosexuality in this regard. According to Jose Ignacio Cabezon, Buddhist cultures' attitudes towards homosexuality have generally been neutral.

While traditional Vinaya rules allow ordination for both men and women, individuals described in ancient texts as having ambiguous or dual sexual characteristics (such as ubhatobyañjanaka) were historically excluded. According to the ancient texts this is because of the possibility that they will seduce monks or nuns. The Vinaya also prevents pandakas from becoming monastics, which have been defined as "without testicles" and generally referred to those who lacked the normal (usually physical) characteristics of maleness (in some cases it refers to women who lack the normal characteristics of femaleness). This rule was established by the Buddha after a pandaka monk broke the Vinaya precepts by having relations with others. Therefore, it seems that pandakas were initially allowed into the Sangha. Later Buddhist texts like the Milinda Panha and the Abhidharma-kosa see pandakas as being spiritually hindered by their sexuality and mental defilements.

=== Economic ethics ===
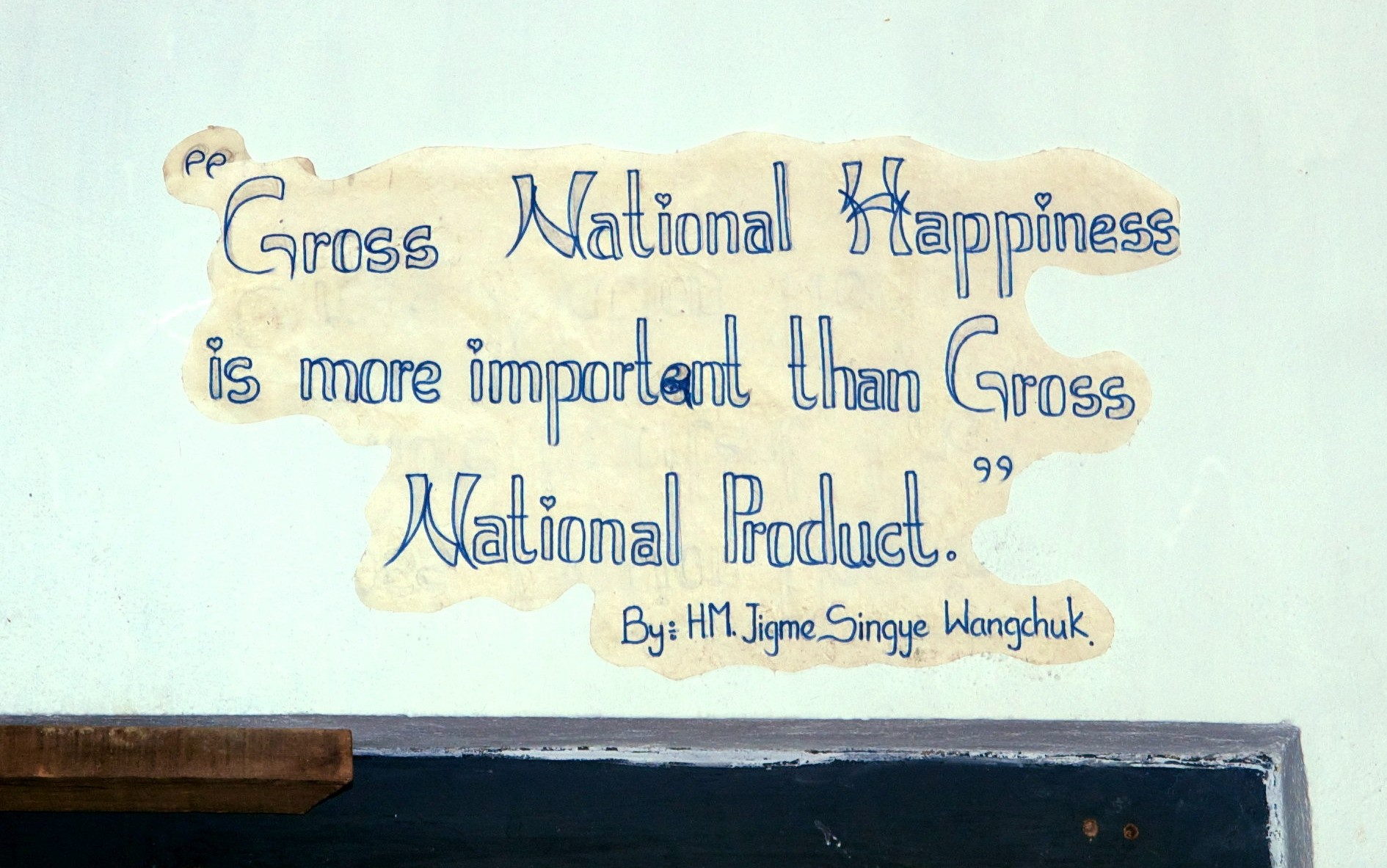
Bhutan's government promotes the concept of 'Gross National Happiness' (GNH), based on Buddhist spiritual values.

Buddha's teachings to laypeople included advice on how to make their living and how to use their wealth. The Buddha considered the creation of wealth to be praiseworthy, so long as it was done morally, in accordance with right livelihood, one of the elements of the Noble Eightfold Path, and which refers to making one's living without killing, being complicit in the suffering of other beings (by selling weapons, poison, alcohol or flesh) or through lying, stealing or deceit.

The Sigalovada Sutta states that a master should look after servants and employees by: "(1) by assigning them work according to their ability, (2) by supplying them with food and with wages, (3) by tending them in sickness, (4) by sharing with them any delicacies, (5) by granting them leave at times" (Digha Nikaya 31). Early Buddhist texts see success in work as aided by one's spiritual and moral qualities.

In the Adiya Sutta the Buddha also outlined several ways in which people could put their 'righteously gained' wealth to use:

1. Providing 'pleasure & satisfaction' to themselves, their mother & father, their children, spouse, slaves, servants, & assistants.
2. Providing 'pleasure & satisfaction' to their friends and associates.
3. Warding off calamities coming from fire, flood, kings, thieves, or hateful heirs, and keeps himself safe.
4. Performs five oblations/offerings: to relatives, guests, the dead, kings, & devas.
5. Giving of offerings to priests (brahmins) and contemplatives (monks).

The Buddha placed much emphasis on the virtue of giving and sharing, and hence the practice of donating and charity are central to Buddhist economic ethics. Even the poor are encouraged to share, because this brings about greater spiritual wealth: "If beings knew, as I know, the results of giving & sharing, they would not eat without having given, nor would the stain of selfishness overcome their minds. Even if it were their last bite, their last mouthful, they would not eat without having shared, if there were someone to receive their gift." The modern growth of Engaged Buddhism has seen an emphasis on social work and charity. Buddhist aid and activist organizations include Buddhist Global Relief, Lotus Outreach, Buddhist Peace Fellowship, Piyarra Kutta, International Network of Engaged Buddhists, The Tzu Chi Foundation, Nonviolent Peaceforce, and Zen Peacemakers.

Buddhist texts promote the building of public works which benefit the community and stories of Buddhist Kings like Ashoka are used as an example of lay people who promoted the public welfare by building hospitals and parks for the people. The Buddha's chief lay disciple, the rich merchant Anathapindika ('Feeder of the Poor') is also another example of a virtuous layperson who donated much of his wealth for the benefit of others and was thus known as the "foremost disciple in generosity". Early Buddhist texts do not disparage merchants and trade, but instead promote enterprise as long as it is done ethically and leads to the well-being of the community. The gold standard for rulers in Buddhism is the ideal wheel turning king, the Chakravartin. A Chakravartin is said to rule justly, giving to the needy and combating poverty so as to prevent social unrest. A Chakravartin does not fight wars for gain but only in defense of the kingdom, he accepts immigrants and refugees, and builds hospitals, parks, hostels, wells, canals and rest houses for the people and animals. Mahayana Buddhism maintains that lay Bodhisattvas should engage in social welfare activities for the good and safety of others. In the lands of Southern Buddhism, Buddhist monasteries often became places were the poor, destitute, orphaned, elderly can take shelter. Monasteries often provided education and took care of the sick, and therefore are also centers of social welfare for the poor.

Robert Thurman, in his discussion of Nagarjuna's Precious Garland Ratnavali sees the Mahayana Buddhist tradition as politically supporting "a welfare state ...a rule of compassionate socialism". Prominent Buddhist socialists include the 14th Dalai Lama, Buddhadasa, B. R. Ambedkar, U Nu, Girō Seno'o and Lin Qiuwu. Others such as Neville Karunatilake, E. F. Schumacher, Padmasiri De Silva, Prayudh Payutto and Sulak Sivaraksa have promoted a Buddhist economics that does not necessarily define itself as socialist but still offers a critique of modern consumer capitalism. E. F. Schumacher in his "Buddhist economics" (1973) wrote: "Buddhist economics must be very different from the economics of modern materialism, since the Buddhist sees the essence of civilisation not in a multiplication of human wants but in the purification of human character."

While modern economics seeks to satisfy human desires, Buddhism seeks to reduce our desires and hence Buddhist economics would tend to promote a sense of anti-consumerism and simple living. In his Buddhist Economics: A Middle Way for the Market Place, Prayudh Payutto writes that consumption is only a means to an end which is 'development of human potential' and 'well being within the individual, within society and within the environment'. From a Buddhist perspective then, 'Right consumption' is based on well-being while 'wrong consumption' is the need to 'satisfy the desire for pleasing sensations or ego-gratification'. Similarly, Sulak Sivaraksa argues that "the religion of consumerism emphasizes greed, hatred and delusion" which causes anxiety and that this must be countered with an ethic of satisfaction Modern attempts to practice Buddhist economics can be seen in the Sarvodaya Shramadana Movement and in the Gross National Happiness economics of Bhutan.

While Buddhism encourages wealth gained ethically, it sees greed and craving for riches as negative, and praises contentment as 'the greatest wealth'. Poverty and debt are seen as causes of suffering, immorality, and social unrest if they prevent one from having basic necessities and peace of mind. For laypeople, Buddhism promotes the middle way between a life of poverty and a materialistic or consumerist life in which one is always seeking to enrich oneself and to buy more things. For Buddhist laypersons then, to be Buddhist does not mean to reject all material things, but, according to Sizemore and Swearer: "it specifies an attitude to be cultivated and expressed in whatever material condition one finds oneself. To be non-attached is to possess and use material things but not to be possessed or used by them. Therefore, the idea of non-attachment applies all across Buddhist society, to laymen and monk alike."

=== Engaged Buddhism ===
Engaged Buddhism is a movement to apply Buddhist ethics including the bodhisattva path, giving (dana) and loving-kindness (metta or maitri), and Noble Eightfold Path to the world. Thich Nhat Hanh coined the term "engaged Buddhism" in his 1967 book Vietnam: Lotus in a Sea of Fire. Nhat Hanh did not feel it was a new concept but was rooted in early Buddhist doctrine which he built on for the Plum Village Tradition. Nhất Hạnh was inspired by the humanistic Buddhism reform movement in China led by Taixu and Yinshun and later propagated in Taiwan by Cheng Yen and Hsing Yun. Modern engaged Buddhism was also popularized by the Indian jurist, politician, and social reformer B. R. Ambedkar, who inspired the Dalit Buddhist movement in the 1950s. Engaged Buddhism has since spread to the Indian subcontinent and the West.

== See also ==
- Ahimsa
- Buddhism and violence
- Buddhist monasticism
- Culture of Buddhism
- Eight precepts
- Five precepts
- Noble Eightfold Path
- Forgiveness § Buddhism
- Sacca-kiriya
- Three Refuges
- Threefold Training
- Pali
- View (Buddhism)
