= Khujjuttara =

Prominent lay disciple of the Buddha

Kubjottarā
- Title: Foremost among laywomen of wide learning (Sanskrit: Bahuśruta) (Pali: Bahussuta)

Personal life
- Born: year unknown
- Occupation: Servant of Queen Śyāmāvatī

Religious life
- Religion: Buddhism
- School: all

Senior posting
- Teacher: The Buddha

Translations of Kubjottarā
- Sanskrit: Kubjottarā, Kubjuttarā
- Pali: Khujjuttarā
- Chinese: 久壽多羅、堀述多羅 (Pinyin: Jiǔshòuduōluó, Kūshùduōluó)
- Japanese: 久寿多羅 (Rōmaji: kujutara)
- Khmer: ខុជ្ជុត្តរា
- Korean: 구수다라 (RR: Kusudara)
- Tibetan: Rgur 'jog
- Thai: ขุชชุตตรา; RTGS: khutchuttara

Khujjuttarā was one of the Buddha's foremost (Sanskrit: agra, Pali: agga) female lay disciples (Pāli: upāsikā, sāvakā).

According to commentaries of the Pāli Canon, Khujjuttarā was a servant to one of the queens of King Udena of Kosambi named Sāmāvatī. Since the queen was unable to go listen to the Buddha, she sent Khujjuttarā who went instead and became so adept that she was able to memorize the teachings and teach the queen and her 500 ladies in waiting. From these discourses of the Buddha, Khujjuttarā, Queen Samavati and the queen's 500 ladies in waiting all obtained the fruit (Pali: phalla) of the first stage of Enlightenment ("stream-enterer," Pāli: Sotāpanna).

In the Pāli Canon itself, Khujjuttarā's repute is mentioned in the SN 17.24, entitled "Only Daughter," the Buddha states that faithful female lay disciples should urge their beloved daughters in the following manner:

"Dear, you should become like Khujjuttarā the lay follower and Velukandakiyā, Nanda's mother – for this is the standard and criterion for my female disciples who are lay followers, that is Khujjuttarā the lay follower and Velukandakiyā, Nanda's mother."

A similar reference is made in AN 4.18.6. Additionally, in AN 1.14, verse 260, the Buddha declares Khujjuttarā to be his "most learned" female lay disciple.

The Khuddaka Nikāya book Itivuttaka, a collection of 112 short discourses, is attributed to Khujjuttarā's recollection of Buddha's discourses.

== See also ==
- Khemā
- Uppalavannā
- Vajirā
- Visākhā
- Householder (Buddhism)

== Bibliography ==
- Bodhi, Bhikkhu (trans.) (2000). The Connected Discourses of the Buddha: A Translation of the Saṃyutta Nikāya. Boston: Wisdom Publications. ISBN 0-86171-331-1.
- Ireland, John (trans. & intro.) (1999). Itivuttaka: The Buddha's Sayings (excerpts). Article's "Introduction" is available on-line at http://www.accesstoinsight.org/tipitaka/kn/iti/iti.intro.irel.html#intro.
- Thanissaro Bhikkhu (trans. & intro.) (2001). Itivuttaka: This Was Said by the Buddha. "Translator's Introduction" is available on-line at http://www.accesstoinsight.org/tipitaka/kn/iti/iti.intro.than.html#intro.
