= Itivuttaka =

Buddhist scripture

Itivuttaka As it was said
- SuttaCentral; OpenTipitaka
- Type: Canonical text
- Parent: Khuddaka Nikāya
- Attribution: Khujjuttarā; Bhāṇaka
- Aṭṭhakathā: Paramatthadīpanī (Itivuttaka-aṭṭhakathā)
- Commentator: Dhammapāla
- Abbreviation: Iti; Itv

The Itivuttaka (Pāli: "as it was said") is a Buddhist scripture, part of the Pāli Canon of Theravāda Buddhism and is attributed to Khujjuttarā's recollection of Buddha's discourses. It is included there in the Sutta Piṭaka's Khuddaka Nikāya. It comprises 112 short teachings ascribed in the text to the Buddha, each consisting of a prose portion followed by a verse portion. The latter may be a paraphrase of the former, or complementary. Some scholars consider it one of the earliest of all Buddhist scriptures, while others consider it somewhat later.

== Etymology ==
The title "Itivuttaka" is a compound word, takes its name from each discourse beginning with the Pāli word "vuttam" (this was said [by the Buddha]) and concluding with the phrase "iti me sutan-ti" (that is what I heard). This differing vocabulary is said to have been used by Khujjuttarā to imply the discourses are not her own, distinguishing it from other suttas in the Pāli Canon which begin with Evaṃ me sutaṃ (Thus have I heard).

== History ==
According to tradition, the Itivuttaka's verses were recollections from the laywoman Khujjuttarā, a servant of Queen Sāmāvati of Kosambi. Khujjuttarā was often sent by Sāmāvati to purchase eight coins worth of flowers, but would only purchase four coins worth, stealing the rest of the money. After the florist invited Buddha to a meal, Khujjuttarā was invited to participate, attaining the path and fruit of Sotapatti before the discourse had finished. Regretting her dishonesty, she purchased eight coins worth of flowers and confessed to Sāmāvati. Sāmāvati would forgive her, appointing Khujjuttarā as a personal attendant, instructing her to visit the monastery near Kosambi each day and relay the Buddha's sermons to the women of the palace, resulting in Khujjuttarā becoming foremost in learning among laywomen (AN 1.260). On returning from the monastery, the women of the palace were said to place Khujjuttarā on a high seat in order to show respect to the teaching as she repeated one of the Buddha's discourses. Eventually, Ānanda gave discourse to the women of the palace prompting a gift of 500 robes in gratitude for the Buddha's teaching, which was matched by 500 more robes gifted by King Udena. All five-hundred would become Stream Enterers by the time of their deaths as a result of practice according to the sermons shared by Khujjuttarā and Ānanda (Ud 7.10).

During the Buddha's lifetime, there was a text known as the Itivuttaka mentioned as one of the nine aṅgas (categories) of the Buddha's teaching which predate the modern organisation of the Pali Tipitaka, however it is unclear if this corresponds to the collection we now have under this name. At the First Buddhist Council at Rajagaha, Ananda rehearsed these Suttas in their current form. In Mahayana Buddhism, sayings known as "itivṛttaka" became part of the twelve aṅgas. Around the 6th century CE, the commentator Dhammapāla wrote the commentary for the Itivuttaka as part of the Paramatthadīpanī, a series of commentaries.

Due to the short length of the discourses and its encouraging tone, the Itivuttaka is one of the most popular and widely-translated pieces of Theravāda literature. A Latin-script edition of the Itivuttaka edited by Ernst Windisch was first published by the Pali Text Society in 1889. The first English translation was published as Sayings of Buddha by Justin Hartley Moore in 1908. In 1935, the Pali Text Society would publish F. L. Woodward's Minor Anthologies of the Pali Canon, Part II which would include his translations of both the Udāna and Itivuttaka. In 1991, John D. Ireland's translation of the Itivuttaka was published. In 2000, Peter Masefield would publish a literal translation for the Pali Text Society which would aim at presenting the text as seen through the eyes of fifth-century Theravāda orthodoxy. In 2001, Ṭhānissaro Bhikkhu would publish his translation under the title This Was Said by the Buddha. In 2017, Kiribathgoda Gnanananda Thera would release a translation as This Was Said By the Buddha from the Sinhala. In 2018, Anagārika Mahendra (later Bhikkhu Mahinda) would publish his translation as Book of This Was Said.

=== Parallels ===
While the Pāli edition has been the standard for Western translations, there are existing parallels in other languages. These include:

- "Gāndhārī Itivuttaka" – a reconstructed manuscript of the Itivuttaka written in Gāndhārī and conserved in July 2025, currently part of the Islamabad Museum collection of Gandhāran Buddhist texts.
- "Benshijing" 本事經 (Taishō vol. 17, sūtra 765) – translated by Xuanzang in CE 650, the first two sections are similar to the Pāli, while the third is missing over three fifths. The Chinese parallel has only 65 sūtras compared to the 112 in the Pāli text, however some of these are not present in the Pāli. Watanabe argues that this text is of a later date than the Pāli, and is likely attributed to the Sarvāstivādin school.
- "Khotanese Fragments" (IOL Khot 154/4 with 19/4) – parts of the "Bodhisattva Compendium" correspond to two passages in the Benshijing, with parallels in the Pāli Itivuttaka and Aṅguttara Nikāya.

== Organisation ==
The Itivuttaka is a short book which resembles the Aṅguttara Nikāya in structure, as it is organised according to four unequal sections based on the number of items in each saying. Ernst Windisch gave a numbering system to the Pali text which is still used used by the Pali Text Society to this day (giving all the Suttas a number in sequence) in order to make referencing them easier. Other ways of numbering the Itivuttaka are using the traditional approach of three levels of groups, or by verse and chapter. Another similarity with the Aṅguttara Nikāya is the text having the prose section followed by a verse, which Ṭhānissaro Bhikkhu claims is "apparently one of the Buddha's techniques for helping his listeners remember his message". Ṭhānissaro also notes that while the overall text is not as literary as the Dhammapada or Udana, text utilises each Nipāta ending on a strong literary rasa (savor) which portrays something astonishing.

Nipāta / Book	Vagga / Section
Ekakanipāto (The Book of Ones)	Paṭhamavaggo / First Section: 1. Lobhasutta (The Greed Sutta); 2. Dosasutta (The Hatred Sutta); 3. Mohasutta (The Delusion Sutta); 4. Kodhasutta (The Anger Sutta); 5. Makkhasutta (The Smearing Sutta); 6. Mānasutta (The Conceit Sutta); 7. Sabbapariññāsutta (The Fully Understanding All Sutta); 8. Mānapariññāsutta (The Fully Understanding Conceit Sutta); 9. Lobhapariññāsutta (The Fully Understanding Greed Sutta); 10. Dosapariññāsutta (The Fully Understanding Hatred Sutta); Dutiyavaggo: 11. Mohapariññāsutta (The Fully Understanding Delusion Sutta); 12. Kodhapariññāsutta (The Fully Understanding Anger Sutta); 13. Makkhapariññāsutta (The Fully Understanding Smearing Sutta); 14. Avijjānīvaraṇasutta (The Hindrance that is Ignorance Sutta); 15. Taṇhāsaṁyojanasutta (The Fetter that is Craving Sutta); 16. Paṭhamasekhasutta (The First Sekha Sutta); 17. Dutiyasekhasutta (The Second Sekha Sutta); 18. Saṁghabhedasutta (The Split in the Sangha Sutta); 19. Saṁghasāmaggīsutta (Harmony in the Sangha Sutta); 20. Paduṭṭhacittasutta (The Heart that is Full of Hate Sutta); Tatiyavaggo: 21. Pasannacittasutta (The Devoted Heart Sutta); 22. Mettasutta (The Have No Fear of Meritorious Deeds Sutta); 23. Ubhayatthasutta (The Both Goals Sutta); 24. Aṭṭhipuñjasutta (The Pile of Bones Sutta); 25. Musāvādasutta (The Telling Lies Sutta); 26. Dānasutta (The Alms Sutta); 27. Mettābhāvanāsutta (The Bringing Loving-kindness into Being Sutta)
Dukanipāto (The Book of Twos)	Paṭhamavaggo: 28. Dukkhavihārasutta (The Uneasy Abiding Sutta); 29. Sukhavihārasutta (The Easy Abiding Sutta); 30. Tapanīyasutta (The Conducive to Torment Sutta); 31. Atapanīyasutta (The Not Conducive to Torment Sutta); 32. Paṭhamasīlasutta (The First Moral Conduct Sutta); 33. Dutiyasīlasutta (The Second Moral Conduct Sutta); 34. Ātāpīsutta (The Ardent Sutta); 35. Paṭhamajananakuhanasutta (The First Not Deceiving Sutta); 36. Dutiyajananakuhanasutta (The Second Not Deceiving Sutta); 37. Somanassasutta (The Euphoria Sutta); Dutiyavaggo; 38. Vitakkasutta (The Thought Sutta); 39. Desanāsutta (The Teaching Sutta); 40. Vijjāsutta (The Knowledge Sutta); 41. Paññāparihīnasutta (The Deficient in Insight Sutta); 42. Sukkadhammasutta (The Bright States Sutta); 43. Ajātasutta (The Unborn Sutta); 44. Nibbānadhātusutta (The Nibbāna-element Sutta); 45. Paṭisallānasutta (The Seclusion Sutta); 46. Sikkhānisaṁsasutta (The Advantages in the Trainings Sutta); 47. Jāgariyasutta (The Wakefulness Sutta); 48. Āpāyikasutta (The Destined to a State of Loss Sutta); 49. Diṭṭhigatasutta (The Views Sutta)
Tikanipāto (The Book of Threes)	Paṭhamavaggo: 50. Mūlasutta (The Root Sutta); 51. Dhātusutta (The Element Sutta); 52. Paṭhamavedanāsutta (The First Sensations Sutta); 53. Dutiyavedanāsutta (The Second Sensations Sutta); 54. Paṭhamaesanāsutta (The First Seekings Sutta); 55. Dutiyaesanāsutta (The Second Seekings Sutta); 56. Paṭhamaāsavasutta (The First Āsavas Sutta); 57. Dutiyaāsavasutta (The Second Āsavas Sutta); 58. Taṇhāsutta (The Cravings Sutta); 59. Māradheyyasutta (The Mara's Realm Sutta); Dutiyavaggo: 60. Puññakiriyavatthusutta (The Base of Meritorious Deeds Sutta); 61 Cakkhusutta (The Eyes Sutta); 62 Indriyasutta (The Faculties Sutta); 63 Addhāsutta (The Periods Sutta); 64 Duccaritasutta (The Misconducts Sutta); 65 Sucaritasutta (The Good Conducts Sutta); 66 Soceyyasutta (The Purities Sutta); 67 Moneyyasutta (The Sagacities Sutta); 68 Paṭhamarāgasutta (The First Lust Sutta); 69 Dutiyarāgasutta (The Second Lust Sutta); Tatiyavaggo: 70. Micchādiṭṭhikasutta (The Of Wrong View Sutta); 71. Sammādiṭṭhikasutta (The Of Wrong View Sutta); 72. Nissaraṇiyasutta (The Escaping Sutta); 73. Santatarasutta (The More Calm Sutta); 74. Puttasutta (The Sons Sutta); 75. Avuṭṭhikasutta (The Rainless One Sutta); 76. Sukhapatthanāsutta (The Longing for Happiness Sutta); 77. Bhidurasutta (The Fragile Sutta); 78. Dhātusosaṁsandanasutta (The Flowing Together Due To An Element Sutta); 79. Parihānasutta (The Falling Away Sutta); Catutthavaggo: 80. Vitakkasutta (The Thoughts Sutta); 81. Sakkārasutta (The Respect Sutta); 82. Devasaddasutta (The Deva-Sounds Sutta); 83. Pañcapubbanimittasutta (The Five Foretokens Sutta); 84. Bahujanahitasutta (The Well-being of Manyfolk Sutta); 85. Asubhānupassīsutta (The Contemplating the Foul Sutta); 86. Dhammānudhammapaṭipannasutta (The Practising that Dhamma that is Consistent with Dhamma Sutta); 87. Andhakaraṇasutta (The Rendering Blind Sutta); 88. Antarāmalasutta (The Inward Stains Sutta); 89. Devadattasutta (The Devadatta Sutta); Pañcamavaggo: 90. Aggappasādasutta (The Chief Devotions Sutta); 91. Jīvikasutta (The Livelihood Sutta); 92. Saṅghāṭikaṇṇasutta (The Corner of the Saṅghāṭi-robe Sutta); 93. Aggisutta (The Fire Sutta); 94 Upaparikkhasutta (The Examining Sutta); 95 Kāmūpapattisutta (The States of Existence Involving Sense-pleasures Sutta); 96 Kāmayogasutta (The Yoke Involving Sense-pleasures Sutta); 97 Kalyāṇasīlasutta (The One With A Lovely Morality Sutta); 98 Dānasutta (The Gifts Sutta); 99 Tevijjasutta (The Three-Veda Sutta)
Catukkanipāto (The Book of Fours)	Paṭhamavaggo: 100. Brāhmaṇadhammayāgasutta (The Brahmin, Dhamma and Sacrifice Sutta); 101. Sulabhasutta (The Easily Gained Sutta); 102. Āsavakkhayasutta (The Destruction of the Āsavas Sutta); 103. Samaṇabrāhmaṇasutta (The Recluses and Brahmins Sutta); 104. Sīlasampannasutta (The Possessed of Morality Sutta); 105. Taṇhuppādasutta (The Cravings-Arisings Sutta); 106. Sabrahmakasutta (The With Their Brahmās Sutta); 107. Bahukārasutta (The Very Useful Sutta); 108. Kuhasutta (The Deceitful Sutta); 109. Nadīsotasutta (The River's Stream Sutta); 110. Carasutta (The Moving About Sutta); 111. Sampannasīlasutta (The Possessed of Morality Sutta); 112. Lokasutta (The World Sutta)

== Excerpts ==
The following English translations are from Bhikkhu Sujato's translation (2020) while using Pali from the World Tripitaka Edition.

=== Ekakanipāto (The Book of Ones) ===
Iti 1.
This was said by the Buddha, the Perfected One: that is what I heard. “Mendicants, give up one thing and I guarantee you non-return. What one thing? Greed is the one thing. Give it up, and I guarantee you non-return.” The Buddha spoke this matter. On this it is said:

“When overcome by greed beings go to a bad place. Having rightly understood that greed, the discerning give it up. Once they’ve given it up, they never return to this world.”

This too is a matter that was spoken by the Blessed One: that is what I heard.
Vuttañhetaṁ bhagavatā vuttamarahatāti me sutaṁ:

“Ekadhammaṁ, bhikkhave, pajahatha; ahaṁ vo pāṭibhogo anāgāmitāya. Katamaṁ ekadhammaṁ? Lobhaṁ, bhikkhave, ekadhammaṁ pajahatha;

ahaṁ vo pāṭibhogo anāgāmitāyā”ti. Etamatthaṁ bhagavā avoca.

Tatthetaṁ iti vuccati:

“Yena lobhena luddhāse,

sattā gacchanti duggatiṁ;

Taṁ lobhaṁ sammadaññāya,

pajahanti vipassino;

Pahāya na punāyanti,

imaṁ lokaṁ kudācanan”ti.

Ayampi attho vutto bhagavatā, iti me sutanti.
Iti 2.
This was said by the Buddha, the Perfected One: that is what I heard.

“Mendicants, give up one thing and I guarantee you non-return. What one thing? Hate is the one thing. Give it up, and I guarantee you non-return.” The Buddha spoke this matter.

On this it is said:

“When overcome by hate

beings go to a bad place. Having rightly understood that hate, the discerning give it up. Once they’ve given it up,

they never return to this world.”

This too is a matter that was spoken by the Blessed One: that is what I heard.
Vuttañhetaṁ bhagavatā vuttamarahatāti me sutaṁ:

“Ekadhammaṁ, bhikkhave, pajahatha; ahaṁ vo pāṭibhogo anāgāmitāya. Katamaṁ ekadhammaṁ? Dosaṁ, bhikkhave, ekadhammaṁ pajahatha; ahaṁ vo pāṭibhogo anāgāmitāyā”ti. Etamatthaṁ bhagavā avoca.

Tatthetaṁ iti vuccati:

“Yena dosena duṭṭhāse,

sattā gacchanti duggatiṁ;

Taṁ dosaṁ sammadaññāya,

pajahanti vipassino;

Pahāya na punāyanti,

imaṁ lokaṁ kudācanan”ti.

Ayampi attho vutto bhagavatā, iti me sutanti.
Iti 3.
This was said by the Buddha, the Perfected One: that is what I heard.

“Mendicants, give up one thing and I guarantee you non-return. What one thing? Delusion is the one thing. Give it up, and I guarantee you non-return.” The Buddha spoke this matter.

On this it is said:

“When overcome by delusion

beings go to a bad place. Having rightly understood that delusion, the discerning give it up. Once they’ve given it up,

they never return to this world.”

This too is a matter that was spoken by the Blessed One: that is what I heard.
Vuttañhetaṁ bhagavatā vuttamarahatāti me sutaṁ:

“Ekadhammaṁ, bhikkhave, pajahatha; ahaṁ vo pāṭibhogo anāgāmitāya. Katamaṁ ekadhammaṁ? Mohaṁ, bhikkhave, ekadhammaṁ pajahatha; ahaṁ vo pāṭibhogo anāgāmitāyā”ti. Etamatthaṁ bhagavā avoca.

Tatthetaṁ iti vuccati:

“Yena mohena mūḷhāse,

sattā gacchanti duggatiṁ; aṁ mohaṁ sammadaññāya, pajahanti vipassino; Pahāya na punāyanti,

imaṁ lokaṁ kudācanan”ti.

Ayampi attho vutto bhagavatā, iti me sutanti.

== Translations ==
- Sayings of Buddha, tr J. H. Moore, Columbia University Press, 1908
- "As it was said", in Minor Anthologies of the Pali Canon, volume II, tr F. L. Woodward, 1935, Pali Text Society, Bristol
- Tr John D. Ireland, Buddhist Publication Society, Kandy, Sri Lanka, 1991; later reprinted in 1 volume with his translation of the Udāna.
- Tr Peter Masefield, 2000, Pali Text Society, Bristol; the PTS's preferred translation; its declared aim is to translate in accordance with the commentary's interpretation
- Tr Ṭhānissaro Bhikkhu, 2013, Itivuttaka: This was said by the Buddha
- Tr Kiribathgoda Gnanananda Thera, Mahamegha Publishers, Waduwawa, Sri Lanka, 2017 (ISBN 978-955-687-113-5)
- Tr Bhikkhu Mahinda (Anagarika Mahendra), Itivuttaka: Book of This Was Said, Bilingual Pali-English Second Edition 2022, Dhamma Publishers, Roslindale MA; ISBN 9780999078150.
- Tr Bhikkhu Sujato, So It Was Said: A delectable translation of the Itivuttaka, SuttaCentral, 2022 (ISBN 978-1-76132-077-4); a public domain translation.

== See also ==
- Khujjuttarā
- Samavati
