= Apatrapya =

Translations of Apatrapya
- English: decorum, shame, consideration, propriety
- Sanskrit: apatrapya, apatrāpya
- Pali: ottappa
- Chinese: 愧(T) / 愧(S)
- Indonesian: rasa takut; rasa takut berbuat jahat
- Korean: 괴 (RR: goi)
- Tibetan: ཁྲེལ་ཡོད་པ། (Wylie: khrel yod pa; THL: trelyö pa)
- Vietnamese: Úy

Apatrapya (Sanskrit, also apatrāpya; Pali: ottappa; Tibetan Wylie: khrel yod pa) is a Buddhist term translated as "decorum" or "shame". It is defined as shunning unwholesome actions so as to not be reproached by others of good character. It is one of the virtuous mental factors within the Abhidharma teachings.

The Abhidharma-samuccaya states:

What is apatrapya? It is to avoid what is objectionable in the eyes of others.

The difference between hri (self-respect) and apatrapya (decorum) is that hri means to refrain from unwholesome actions due to one's own conscience, while apatrapya means to refrain from unwholesome actions to avoid being reproached by others.

== Alternate translations ==
- decorum- Guenther, Rangjung Yeshe Wiki
- shame - Erik Pema Kunsang
- consideration - Rangjung Yeshe Wiki
- propriety - Rangjung Yeshe Wiki

== See also ==
- Mental factors (Buddhism)
