= Hrī (Buddhism) =

Buddhist term

Translations of hri
- English: self-respect, conscientiousness, sense of shame, dignity
- Sanskrit: ह्रीः (hrīḥ, Devanagari) or 𑖮𑖿𑖨𑖱𑖾 (Siddham_script)
- Pali: hiri
- Chinese: 慚(T) / 惭(S) (Pinyin: cán)
- Indonesian: rasa malu; rasa malu berbuat jahat
- Japanese: 慚 (Rōmaji: zan)
- Korean: 참 (RR: cham)
- Tibetan: ངོ་ཚ་ཤེས་པ། (Wylie: ngo tsha shes pa; THL: ngo tsa shepa)
- Vietnamese: Tàm

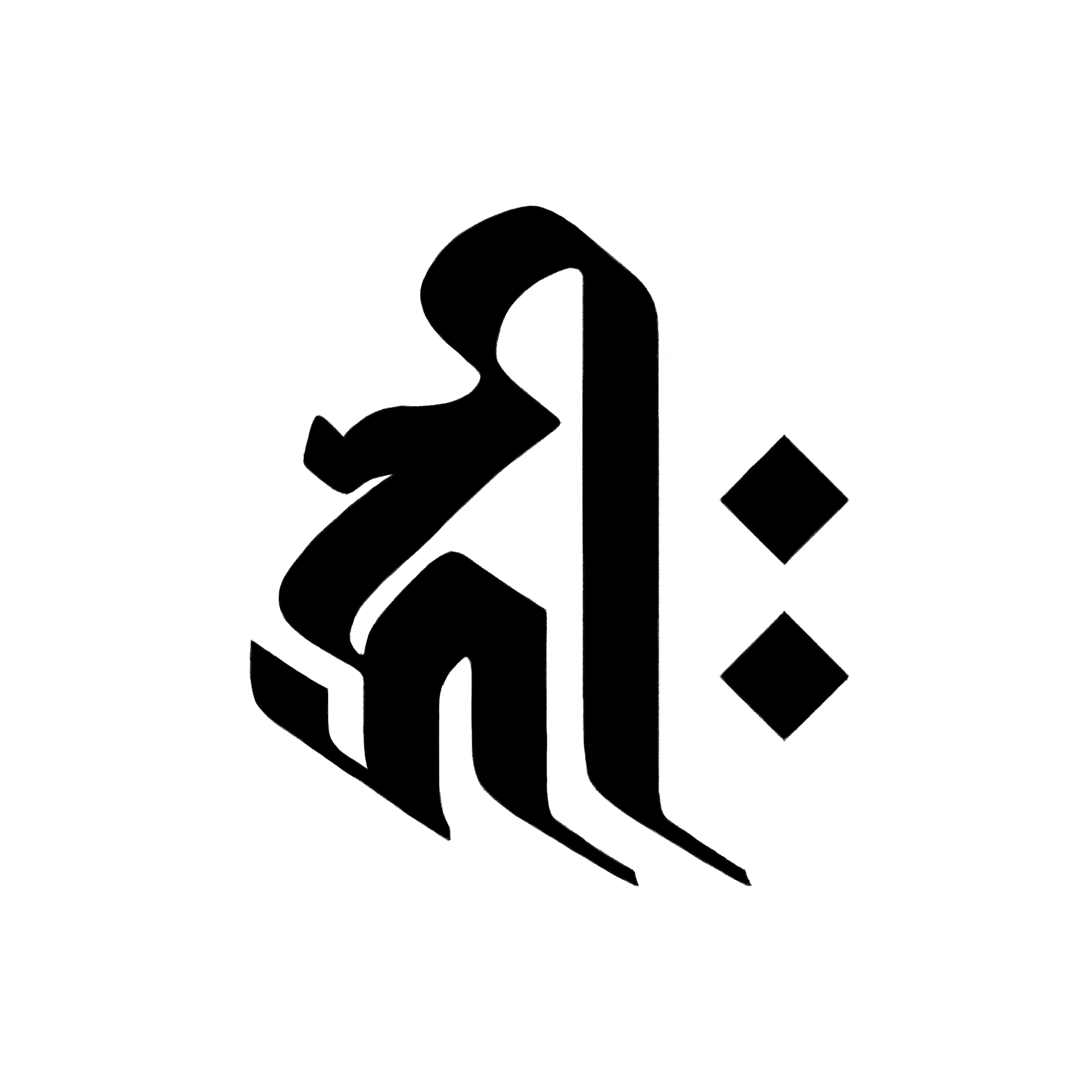
Hrīḥ in Siddhaṃ.

Hri (Sanskrit: ह्रीः or 𑖮𑖿𑖨𑖱𑖾 in Siddham_script, hrīḥ; Pali: hiri) is a Sanskrit Buddhist term translated as "self-respect" or "conscientiousness". Pronounced /hriːh/. It is defined as the attitude of taking earnest care with regard to one's actions and refraining from non-virtuous actions. It is one of the virtuous mental factors within the Abhidharma teachings.

The Abhidharma-samuccaya states:

"What is hri? It is to avoid what is objectionable as far as I see it and its function is to provide a basis for refraining from non-virtuous actions."

== Pali Canon ==
There are two suttas in the Pali Canon that bear the title "Hiri Sutta." Both of these texts focus on the issue of moral shame.

The first sutta (SN 1.18) is a short dialogue between the Buddha and a deity on the nature of conscience.

The second sutta (Sn 2.3) is a question and answer dialogue between the Buddha and an ascetic regarding the nature of true friendship.

== Mahayana ==
Hrīḥ is the seed syllable of the Buddha Amitābha, and represents the qualities of the Buddha of the western quarter, meditation and compassion. In Tibet it is also associated with Avalokiteśvara or Chenresig and is the seed syllable that symbolizes the essence of his mindstream. It is often visualized at the heart center of Chenrezig in meditation practices. The Dalai Lamas are considered to be manifestations of Chenrezig in human form. Therefore, the seed syllable HRI is intrinsically linked to the Dalai Lama lineage. This connection reinforces the Dalai Lamas' role as the embodiment of compassion and wisdom.

The Abhidharmakośabhāsya lists hrī among the ten virtuous mental factors (daśa kuśalamahābhῡmikā dharma; 大善地法).

The Yogācāra tradition recognizes it as one of the eleven wholesome mental factors (ekādaśa-kuśala; 十一善).

The former text states that the difference between hrī and apatrāpya is that the former is dominated by one's own understanding of morality. The latter by contrast, is empowered by one's sense of embarrassment.

== In the commentaries ==
The Pali Paṭṭhāna lists hiri among the twenty-five sobhana cetasikas or "beautiful mental factors."

Hiri often function in conjunction with apatrāpya (Pali: ottappa), or moral dread. These two are responsible for encouraging a person to avoid performing evil actions. Together they are known as lokapāla or "guardians of the world".

The Puggalapaññatti states:

"To be ashamed of what one ought to be ashamed of, to be ashamed of performing evil and unwholesome things: this is called moral shame (hiri). To be in dread of what one ought to be in dread of, to be in dread of performing evil and unwholesome things: this is called moral dread (ottappa)."

== The goddess ==
Hirī or Hiridevī is the name of a goddess and one of Śakra's daughters. Her name is sometimes translated as "Honour".

She appears in several texts, including the Sudhābhojana Jātaka and the Mañjarī Jātaka of the Mahāvastu.

It is also the name of a yaksha that may be invoked in the Āṭānāṭiya Sutta.

== Alternative Translations ==
- self-respect - Herbert Guenther, Dzigar Kongtrul Rinpoche, Rangjung Yeshe Wiki
- conscientiousness - Erik Pema Kunsang
- moral self-dignity - Alexander Berzin
- sense of shame - Rangjung Yeshe Wiki
- dignity

== See also ==
- Apatrāpya
- Mental factors (Buddhism) – Buddhist aspects of the mind
