= Samavati =

Sāmāvatī was one of the queens of King Udena of Kosambi. Her servant Khujjuttarā became a foremost female lay disciple when the queen sent her to hear the Buddha's teachings and tell her about the teachings. Sāmāvatī became so gladdened by Khujjuttarā's discourse, she invited Buddha and his monks regularly to the palace to preach the Dhamma to her and her 500 ladies in waiting. She became the foremost disciple in loving-kindness and compassion.
