= Uppalavanna =

Foremost female disciple of Gautama Buddha, Enlightened Buddhist nun

Most Venerable Bhikkhuni Uppalavannā
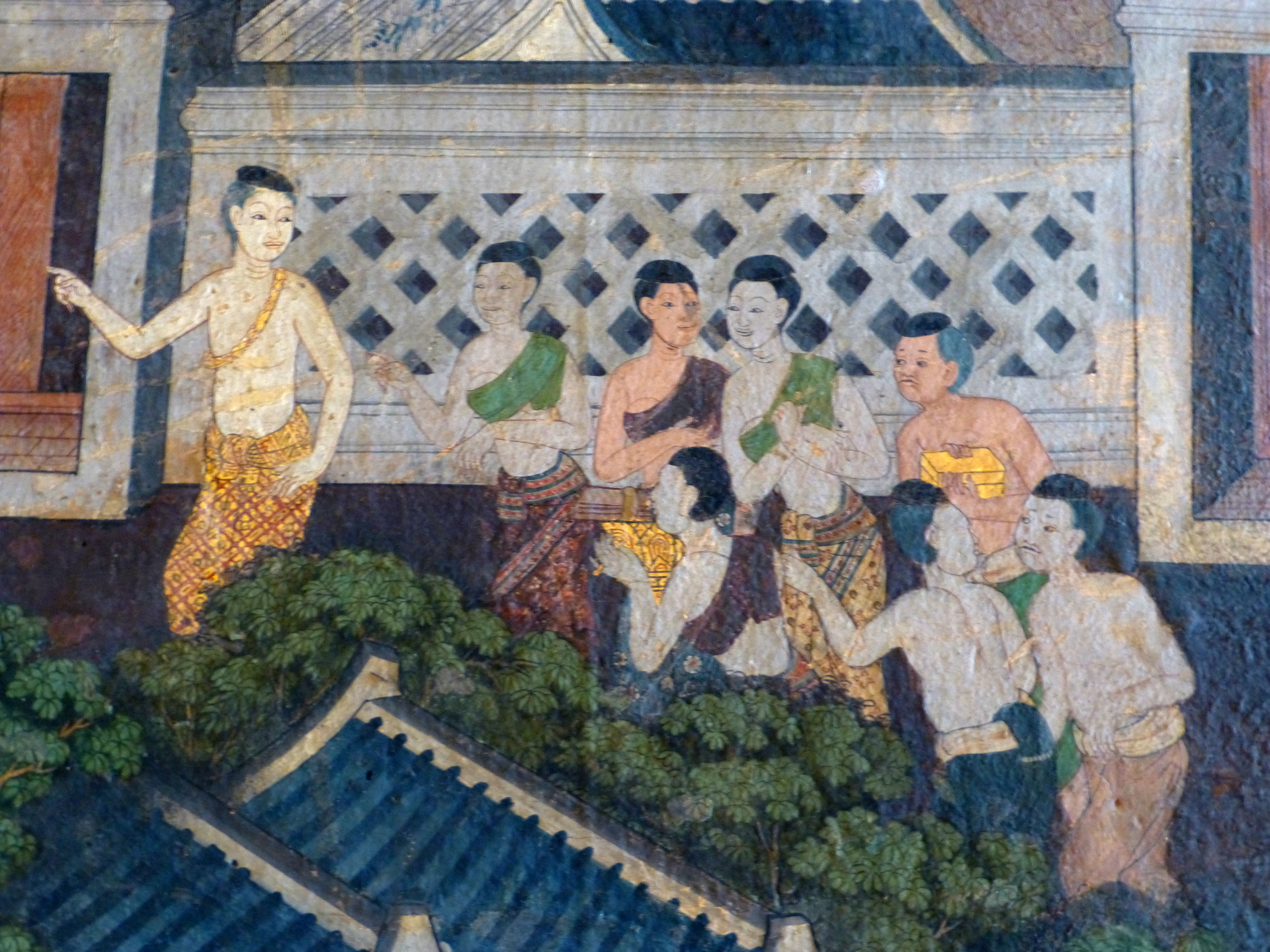
- Uppalavanna in Wat Pho, Bangkok
- Title: Second chief Female Disciple of Gautama Buddha, Female disciple foremost in psychic powers.

Personal life
- Occupation: bhikkhuni

Religious life
- Religion: Buddhism

Senior posting
- Teacher: Buddha

Utpalavarṇā (Sanskrit: उत्पलवर्णा; Pali: Uppalavannā; Chinese: 蓮華色, pinyin: Liánhuásè) was a Buddhist bhikkhuni, or nun, who was considered one of the top female disciples of the Buddha. She is considered the second of the Buddha's two chief female disciples, along with Khema. She was given the name Uppalavanna, meaning "color of a blue water lily", at birth due to the bluish color of her skin.

According to the Theravada tradition, Uppalavanna was born the daughter of a wealthy merchant. Due to her beauty, numerous wealthy and powerful suitors came to her father to ask for her hand in marriage. Instead of marrying, she entered the monastic life under the Buddha as a bhikkhuni. According to the Mulasarvastivada tradition, Utpalavarṇā had a tumultuous life as a wife and courtesan before converting to Buddhism and becoming a bhikkhuni.

Uppalavanna attained enlightenment while using a fire kasina as her object of meditation less than two weeks after her ordination. Following her enlightenment she developed a mastery of iddhipada, or spiritual powers, leading the Buddha to declare her his female disciple foremost in psychic powers. Her male counterpart was Maha Moggallana.

== Textual sources ==
The earliest known record of Uppalavanna comes from a 3rd century BCE stone engraving, portraying her at the Buddha's descent to Sankassa after he visited his mother in Tavatimsa Heaven as described in Buddhist legend. Uppalavanna is mentioned in several early Buddhist texts of the Pali Canon, including the Saṃyutta Nikāya, Aṅguttara Nikāya, and the Therīgāthā and Apadāna collections within the Khuddaka Nikaya as well as some early Mahayana texts such as the Perfection of Wisdom in Eighty-thousand Lines and Treatise on the Great Perfection of Wisdom.

Buddhist scholar Bhikkhu Bodhi notes that, despite being considered one of the Buddha's chief disciples, details about Uppalavanna's life in the Buddhist texts and commentaries are quite scant. Bhikkhu Bodhi points out that there is more in Buddhist texts about one of her previous lives than about the bhikkhuni herself.

== Background ==
In Buddhist belief, when a fully enlightened Buddha appears in the world, he always has a set of chief disciples. For the current Buddha, Gautama, his chief male disciples were Sariputta and Moggallana, while his chief female disciples were Khema and Uppalavanna.

According to the Pali Canon, in a previous life Uppalavanna was born a woman in the time of Padumattara Buddha and witnessed him declare one of his nuns foremost in psychic powers. After hearing the declaration, the woman made the resolve to become the female disciple foremost in psychic powers under a future Buddha and did good deeds for many lifetimes in hopes of becoming one. This wish came true in the time of Gautama Buddha, when she was reborn as Uppalavanna.

== Biography ==
=== Early life and ordination ===
Uppalavanna was given her name (meaning color of a blue water lily) due to being born with a complexion that was the color of a blue water-lily, in accordance with a wish she was said to have made in a past life. According to Theravada tradition Uppalavanna was born into a wealthy merchant family from Savatthi. When Uppalavanna grew up she was known for her immense beauty, with several kings and wealthy suitors coming to her father to ask for her hand in marriage. Not wanting to disappoint so many people, and fearing a potential conflict between the various wealthy and powerful suitors, he suggested Uppalavanna become a bhikkhuni, or nun, under the Buddha. Already being inclined to the holy life, she happily agreed and ordained under the Buddha as a nun. According to the Mulasarvastivada tradition Utpalavarṇā was instead born the daughter of a merchant in Taxila and married to a local. She later found out her husband was having an affair with her mother and leaves him and her newborn daughter. Utpalavarṇā eventually marries another man who takes a second wife, who she later finds out was her daughter that she left behind. Distraught by the discovery, she leaves and becomes a courtesan before being converted by Maha Moggallana and becoming a nun. (Note: Theravada tradition recounts a similar story with the story of Gangatiriya. In this story Gangatiriya is abandoned at birth by his mother and grows up to independently marry his biological mother and long lost sister unwittingly. Gangatiriya becomes a monk after discovering this awful truth about his wives. In the Theravada tradition Uppalavanna recounts this story to reflect on the harm of sense desires, but it is not considered autobiographical.)

=== Enlightenment ===
Buddhist texts relate that Uppalavanna attained enlightenment less than two weeks after ordaining as a bhikkhuni. Shortly after becoming a nun it was Uppalavanna's turn to prepare the observance hall. While the other nuns were out, she lit a lamp and started sweeping the hall in accordance with her duties. Using the fire from the lamp as a kasina, or object of meditation, she entered deeper states of concentration and became a fully enlightened arahant later that night.

=== Chief Disciple ===
Following her enlightenment, Uppalavanna gained a mastery of iddhipada, or spiritual powers, that is described as having been superior to any other nun in the Buddha's time. Because of this, the Buddha designated her the female disciple foremost in psychic powers. The Buddha also praised Uppalavanna for her teaching and leadership skills, declaring her and Khema his chief female disciples that other nuns should take as their model. Uppalavanna and Khema share the title of chief disciples with their male counterparts, Maha Moggallana and Sariputta.

=== Rape ===
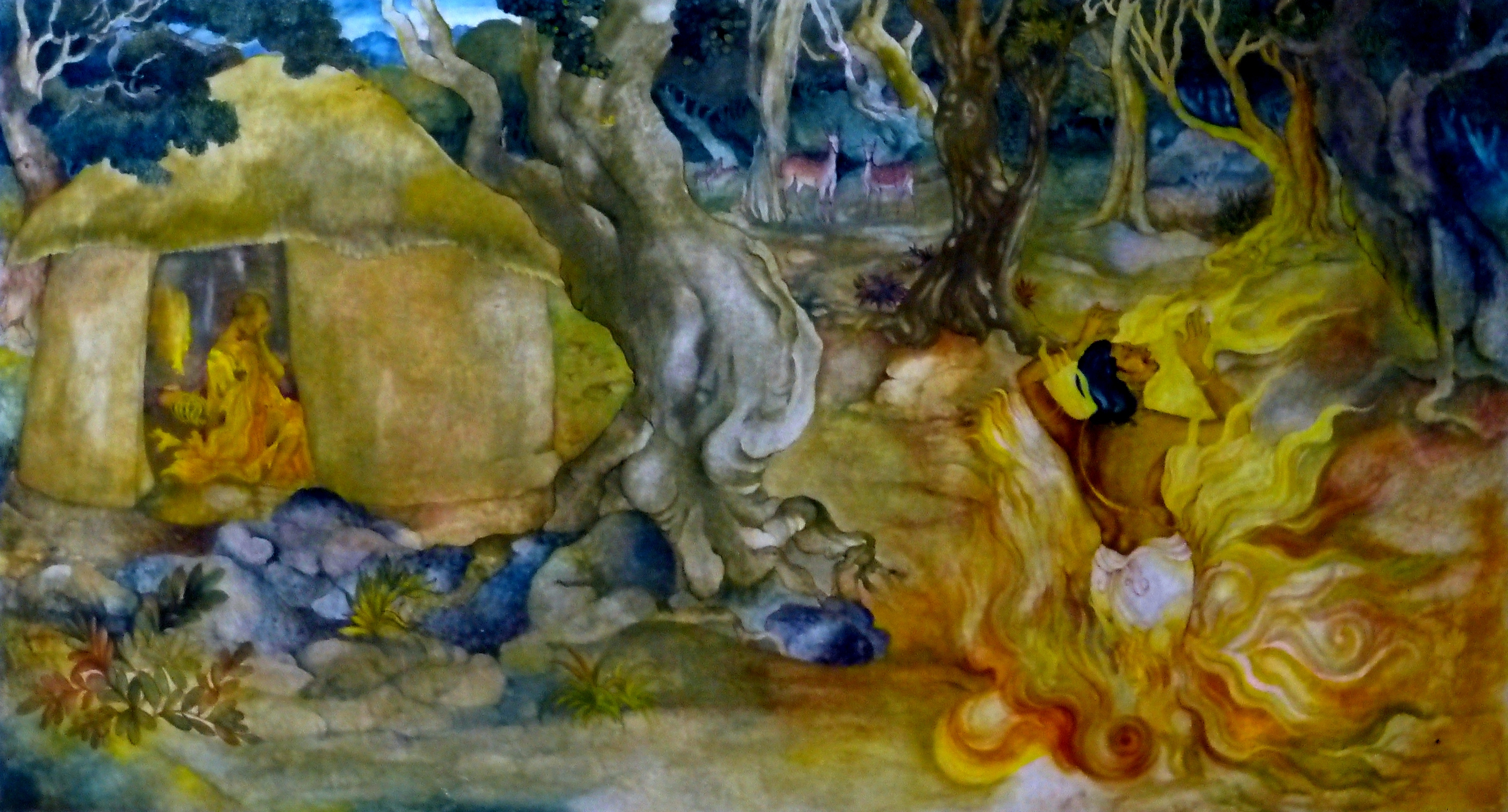
A man is swallowed into Avici after attempting to rape Uppalavanna.

According to the Theravada tradition, a man who lusted after Uppalavanna before her ordination hid in her hut and attempted to rape her. (Note: The Dharmaguptaka and Mulasarvastivada Buddhist traditions have another nun as the rape victim in this story rather than Utpalavarṇā. In the Tibetan Kangyur account, it is also another nun who is the victim but Uppalavanna uses her psychic powers to save her.) Uppalavanna tries to escape using her psychic powers, but due to a bad karma she committed in a past life her psychic powers were rendered ineffective and the rape proceeds. The rapist is then swallowed by the earth and falls to Avici hell for his evil deed. Following the incident, when questioned about the matter, the Buddha states that Uppalavanna did not break the monastic rule of chastity since she gave no consent. This event leads to the creation of a rule prohibiting nuns from dwelling in the wild as a way to protect against such incidents.

=== Cakkavatti Miracle ===
Uppalavanna's most significant display of psychic powers was a miracle she displayed where she transformed into a cakkavatti, or universal monarch, and created a large retinue to pay respect to the Buddha. Buddhist texts describe that she offered to perform this feat during the Miracle at Savatthi, but the Buddha refused and told her to wait for the right time to perform the feat. Uppalavanna performed the miracle four months later at Sankassa when the Buddha returned to earth after spending his rains-retreat in Tavatimsa Heaven.

=== Encounter with Mara ===
Once, when Uppalavanna was meditating in the wilderness alone, Mara attempted to break her concentration. Mara appears and tells her she should be afraid of rogues as a beautiful young woman sitting alone in the wilderness. Being an enlightened arahant, Uppalavanna sees through the charade and describes her psychic abilities, explaining to Mara that she is the master of her own mind and has nothing to fear. Disappointed by his inability to break her concentration, Mara leaves.

== Legacy ==
Uppalavanna shares a complementary role with her male counterpart Maha Moggallana. American bhikkhuni Tathālokā Therī points out that the story of Uppalavanna's rape in the Pali tradition shares a theme with Maha Moggallana, whose psychic powers also suddenly become ineffective on one occasion due to a past karma, which leaves him unable to escape and causes him to get killed by a group of bandits. Anthropologist Ranjini Obeyesekere notes that of the Buddha's two pairs of chief disciples, each pair had one disciple that was dark skinned (Maha Moggallana and Uppalavanna) and one disciple that was light skinned (Sariputta and Khema). Obeyesekere argues that this pairing is meant to symbolize the inclusiveness of the Buddha's teachings, that the Dhamma is meant for people of all colors and classes.

== See also ==
- Sravaka
- Abhijna
- Sariputta
- Maha Moggallana
- Khema
- Vajira
