= Vajira (Buddhist nun) =

Enlightened Buddhist nun

Vajira, a Buddhist nun mentioned in the Samyutta Nikaya (I.134-55), is one of the earliest women adepts in Buddhist history. She was confronted by Mara while meditating and asked about the origin and creator of her "Being", i.e., her soul. She responded by comparing one's "Being" to a chariot, showing that it had no permanent existence but was made up of constituent parts.

== Excerpt and exegesis ==
“Then Mara the Evil One, desiring to arouse fear, trepidation, and terror in the bhikkhuni Vajira, desiring to make her fall away from concentration, approached her and addressed her in verse:

34. "By whom has this being been created? Where is the maker of the being? Where has the being arisen? Where does the being cease?"

Then it occurred to the bhikkhuni Vajira: "Now who is this that recited the verse — a human being or a non-human being?" Then it occurred to her: "This is Mara the Evil One, who has recited the verse desiring to arouse fear, trepidation, and terror in me, desiring to make me fall away from concentration."

Then the bhikkhuni Vajira, having understood, "This is Mara the Evil One," replied to him in verses: 35. "Why now do you assume 'a being'? Mara, have you grasped a view? This is a heap of sheer constructions: Here no being is found.

36. Just as, with an assemblage of parts, The word 'chariot' is used, So, when the aggregates are present, There's the convention 'a being.'

37. It's only suffering that comes to be, Suffering that stands and falls away. Nothing but suffering comes to be, Nothing but suffering ceases."

Then Mara the Evil One, realizing, "The bhikkhuni Vajira knows me," sad and disappointed, disappeared right there.”

This passage is famous not just for succinctly presenting the Buddha’s teaching of non-self through the simile but also for being one of the earliest depictions of a woman adept at comprehending and practising the Buddha’s dhamma. The person Mara seeks to concede as having a metaphysically substantial or permanent essence is only an aggregation of processes, some of which are material (rūpa) and some which are non-material (arūpin). These material and immaterial processes make up the five aggregates (skandhas) which are body, feeling, perception, disposition to actions and consciousness. Just as the term ‘chariot’ is used to refer to an assemblage of parts, such as the wheels, yokes, axles etc., so too is ‘person’ nothing more than a conventional term employed to denote these five aggregates rather than to a permanent essence which the person holds. Each person, like each chariot, is a compound and no compound can be an individual, a being.

== Later usage ==
The simile of the chariot in relation to the Buddhist doctrine of no-self (anattā) was popularised in the Milinda Panha (Questions of King Milinda), an important Pali work dating from the first century ce, although most of the text was written in Sri Lanka at a later date. The text takes the form of a dialogue between King Milinda, who likely ruled Sakala in the east Punjab in the 2nd to 1st centuries bce, and a Buddhist monk, Nagasena. The dialogue begins with Nagasena claiming that ‘Nagasena’ is just a designation and that no individual, permanent self exists. Initially, Milinda disputes this and questions the sage on how merits and demerits for thoughts and actions can be attributed to an individual were no self to exist and subsequently asks what it is then that the name Nagasena does denote. Each in turn, he asks whether it is his body or parts of it, his sensations, his ideas or his consciousness that are denoted by ‘Nagasena’ to which the sage replies in the negative. The king then responds by asking who it is he sees before him. Nagasena replies by way of an analogy with a chariot, beginning by asking the King (after having enquired as to how he had arrived at their meeting), ‘What is a chariot? Is it the wheels, the framework, the ropes, the spokes of the wheel?’ The King argues that none of these things are the chariot but the aggregate of such physical parts composed in certain ways is conventionally understood as a chariot. To this Nagasena responds,

Very good! Your Majesty has rightly grasped the meaning of "chariot." And just even so it is on account of all those things you questioned me about (the thirty-two kinds of organic matter in a human body, and the five constituent elements of being) that I come under the generally understood term, the designation in common use, of "Nâgasena. For it was said, Sire, by our Sister Vagirâ in the presence of the Blessed One:

"Just as it is by the condition precedent of the co-existence of its various parts that the word 'chariot' is used, just so is it that when the Skandhas are there we talk of a 'being ."

Individual beings are without a permanent essence and are simply combinations of material and immaterial processes, subject to change at every moment, that are designated a name for matters of convenience.

== Further application ==
The simile also relates to other strands within Buddhist thought which are explored further in the Milindapanha such as the idea of dependent origination and impermanence.
