= Khema =

Foremost female disciple of Gautama Buddha, Buddhist nun

- Title: Chief Female Disciple

Personal life
- Born: 6th century BCE Sagala (Present day Sialkot, Punjab, Pakistan)
- Spouse: King Bimbisara

Religious life
- Religion: Buddhism

Senior posting
- Teacher: Gautama Buddha

Khema (Pali: Khemā; Sanskrit: Kṣemā) was a Buddhist bhikkhuni, or nun, who was one of the top female disciples of the Buddha. She is considered the first of the Buddha's two chief female disciples, along with Uppalavanna. Khema was born into the royal family of the ancient Kingdom of Madra, and was the wife of King Bimbisara of the ancient Indian kingdom of Magadha. Khema was convinced to visit the Buddha by her husband, who hired poets to sing about the beauty of the monastery he was staying at to her. She attained enlightenment as a laywoman while listening to one of the Buddha's sermons, considered a rare feat in Buddhist texts. Following her attainment, Khema entered the monastic life under the Buddha as a bhikkhuni. According to Buddhist tradition, the Buddha declared her his female disciple foremost in wisdom. Her male counterpart was Sariputta.

== Background ==
In Buddhist belief, when a fully enlightened Buddha appears in the world, he always has a set of chief disciples. For the current Buddha, Gautama, his chief male disciples were Sariputta and Moggallana, while his chief female disciples were Khema and Uppalavanna.

According to Theravada commentaries, in a previous life Khema was born a woman in the time of Padumattara Buddha and encountered Padumattara Buddha's chief male disciple foremost in wisdom. The woman then makes an offering to the monk and makes a resolution to have wisdom like his under a future Buddha. Ānandajoti Bhikkhu notes that this commentary story stands out compared to stories of other nuns because she makes the wish after seeing a chief male disciple rather than a chief female disciple. However, in the Apadāna texts the woman is described as having made the resolution after seeing Padumattara Buddha appoint a nun his chief female disciple. This wish came true in the time of Gautama Buddha, when she was reborn as Khema.

== Biography ==
=== Early life and marriage ===
According to Buddhist tradition, Khema was born in the city of Sagala as the daughter of the king of the Madra Kingdom, located in modern day Sialkot in Punjab, Pakistan. Her name means "security" and is sometimes used as a synonym for Nirvana. Khema was described as being immensely beautiful and having a radiant golden complexion. When she came of age she married King Bimbisara of the kingdom of Magadha and became one of his chief royal consorts.

=== Meeting the Buddha ===
As a chief consort of the king, Khema developed a strong attachment to her beauty and became very vain. As a devout Buddhist himself, King Bimbisara tried multiple times to get his wife to visit the Buddha but Khema always refused. Khema had a strong attachment to her looks and knew the Buddha found fault with physical beauty. Knowing Khema loved beautiful things, King Bimbisara hired poets to recite poems in front of Khema describing the beauty of the monastery the Buddha was staying at in order to entice her to visit. Hearing about the beauty of the monastery, Khema became curious and went to visit the monastery. In order to ensure that Khema encounter the Buddha, King Bimbisara ordered the guards accompanying her to guide the Queen to the Buddha.

As Khema toured the monastery and approached the main hall the Buddha was staying in, the Buddha read her mind and used psychic powers to conjure up an image of a woman even more beautiful than her to appear fanning him. Stunned by the beautiful woman, Khema thought she was mistaken about the Buddha disparaging beauty. As Khema fixated on the image of the beautiful woman, the Buddha aged the image before her eyes, from youth, middle age, old age and then death. Seeing the image of the beautiful woman age and die, Khema realized she too must share the same fate. The Buddha then preached to her about the impermanence of beauty until she attained stream-entry, a level of enlightenment. The Buddha then continued to preach to her about the problems of attachment to worldly desires until she attained arahantship. Following the attainment she joined the Buddha's monastic community and became a bhikkhuni. (Note: In some sources, such as the Apadāna, she attains stream-entry and then becomes an arahant seven months after becoming a bhikkhuni.) Buddhist writer Susan Murcott notes that the story of Khema's enlightenment is a rare case of a laywoman attaining enlightenment before becoming a monastic.

=== Chief disciple ===
After going forth as a bhikkhuni, Buddhist texts state that Khema became known for her wisdom. In the Khema Sutta, she famously preached to King Pasenadi on the issue of the existence of the Buddha after death, explaining that the Buddha is unfathomable and that defining him as existing or not existing after death is impossible. King Pasenadi later asks the same questions to the Buddha himself who, to the king's amazement, answers the same way Khema did. Khema taught her friend Vijayā, leading her to become a nun as well, after which she soon became an arahant. At one point after her ordination, Mara attempted to guide Khema away from the monastic life. Mara takes the form of a young man and attempts to seduce her, but in a drastic shift from her previous conceit, Khema describes her disgust for the human body and explains that she has moved beyond any attachment to the senses. She is also associated with several figures in a variety of jataka tales and stories set in the time of the previous Buddhas, where her previous existences are often shown as being kind and wise. In one jataka tale, she is even the wife of the bodhisattva who would become Gautama Buddha, a role in the jataka tales that is rare for figures other than Yasodhara.

The Buddha designated Khema the female disciple foremost in wisdom (Pali: etadaggaṁ mahāpaññānaṁ). The Buddha also praised her for her teaching and leadership skills, declaring Khema and Uppalavanna his chief female disciples that other nuns should take as their model. Uppalavanna and Khema share the title of chief disciples with their male counterparts, Maha Moggallana and Sariputta.

== Legacy ==
Khema is regarded as an accomplished disciple of the Buddha, holding the same position among the nuns as Sariputta did among the monks. Supakwadee Amatayakul notes that Khema is mentioned in the Anguttara Nikaya as one of the thirteen female disciples of the Buddha and in the Therigatha as one of the seventy three bhikkhunis, each to whom a set of verses is dedicated. Sanskrit and Pali scholar Gisela Krey notes that Khema spiritually surpassed her husband, King Bimbisara, who got no farther than stream-entry. According to German Pali scholar Hellmuth Hecker, Khema's unusually fast attainment of arahantship was no accident, but was something she earned from the great merit that she accumulated over numerous lifetimes, as described in the jatakas. Anthropologist Ranjini Obeyesekere notes that of the Buddha's two pairs of chief disciples, each pair had one disciple that was dark-skinned (Maha Moggallana and Uppalavanna) and one disciple that was light-skinned (Sariputta and Khema). Obeyesekere argues that this pairing is meant to symbolize the inclusiveness of the Buddha's teachings, that the Dhamma is meant for people of all colors and classes.

Murcott argues that Khema's exchange with a powerful king such as King Pasenadi in the Khema Sutta shows how well respected she was, given that society at the time did not even allow female nuns to teach male monks. Krey makes a similar argument, stating that of the scenarios involving women in Buddhist texts, the scenario where a woman is teaching a man is the most rare. In the Khema Sutta, King Pasenadi's servant talks about reports spreading of Khema's great wisdom and King Pasenadi himself acknowledges Khema's superiority to him by paying respect to her. Krey argues that Khema's mastery of the Dhamma as shown in teaching the Khema Sutta, as well as the acknowledgment of her wisdom by contemporary figures, provides evidence that women could reach the same level of spiritual development as men.

== See also ==
- Sravaka
- Paññā
- Sariputta
- Uppalavanna
