= Rangjung Yeshe Wiki =

Wiki community based on translation

- Founded: 2005
- Owner: Tsadra Foundation
- Website: https://rywiki.tsadra.org/
- Content license: Attribution-NonCommercial-ShareAlike 4.0 International

The Rangjung Yeshe Wiki is a Wiki community established in 2005 focused on building a Tibetan-English Dictionary, glossaries of Buddhist terminology, biographies of Buddhist teachers, and articles on important Tibetan Buddhist literary works and collections. The site aims to develop resources useful for the "community of lotsawas" involved in translating Buddhist texts from Classical Tibetan to English and other European Languages. The original content of the Wiki was based on a digital Tibetan-English dictionary compiled by the translator Erik Pema Kunsang in the early 1970s. The Rangjung Yeshe Wiki currently has over 23,720 articles, 1,060 uploaded files, and 825 registered users. The site is hosted and supported by the Tsadra Foundation. The Dharma Dictionary features the Tibetan words of renowned Tibetan translators such as Erik Pema Kunsang (including the complete Rangjung Yeshe Tibetan-English dictionary of Buddhist Culture, Ives Waldo, Jim Valby, Richard Barron, Gyurme Dorje, Thomas Doctor, Matthieu Ricard and more.
