= Śrāvaka =

Sanskrit word for a disciple used in Buddhism and Jainism

Translations of Śrāvaka
- Sanskrit: श्रावक śrāvaka
- Pali: sāvaka
- Burmese: သာဝက (MLCTS: θàwəka̰)
- Chinese: 聲聞 (Pinyin: shēngwén)
- Japanese: 声聞 (Rōmaji: shōmon)
- Khmer: សាវ័ក (Saveak)
- Sinhala: ශ්‍රාවක (Shravaka)
- Thai: สาวก (Sawok)
- Vietnamese: Thanh văn 聲聞

Śrāvaka (Sanskrit) or sāvaka (Pali) means "hearer" or, more generally, "disciple". This term is used in Buddhism and Jainism. In Jainism, a śrāvaka is any lay Jain so the term śrāvaka has been used for the Jain community itself (for example see Sarak and Sarawagi). Śrāvakācāras are the lay conduct outlined within the treaties by Śvetāmbara or Digambara mendicants. "In parallel to the prescriptive texts, Jain religious teachers have written a number of stories to illustrate vows in practice and produced a rich répertoire of characters."

In Buddhism, the term is sometimes reserved for distinguished disciples of the Buddha.

== Buddhism ==
=== Early Buddhism ===
In early Buddhism, a śrāvaka or śrāvikā is a disciple who accepts:

- the Buddha as their teacher
- the Buddha's teaching (the Dharma), including understanding the Four Noble Truths, ridding oneself of the unreality of the phenomenal, and pursuing nirvana. See, for instance, the Anguttara Nikaya's second Metta Sutta (AN 4.126) when, taken in consideration of the first "Metta Sutta" (AN 4.125), a disciple is described as one who "regards whatever phenomena there that are connected with form, feeling, perception, fabrications, & consciousness, as inconstant, stressful, a disease, a cancer, an arrow, painful, an affliction, alien, a disintegration, an emptiness, not-self."
- the community rules of conduct: the Five Precepts for laypersons, the prātimokṣa for monastics.

In the Nikāya, depending on the context, a sāvaka can also refer to a disciple of a teacher other than the Buddha.

=== Theravada Buddhism ===
In Theravada Buddhism, a śrāvaka or śrāvikāt refers to one who followed in the tradition of the senior monks of the first Buddhist sangha and community. In the Pāli Canon, the term "disciple" transcends monastic-lay divisions and can refer to anyone from the following "four assemblies":

- bhikkhus ("monks")
- bhikkuṇīs ("nuns")
- upāsakas and upāsikā (laypersons of both sexes)

Buddhist texts further mention four types of disciples based on spiritual accomplishment:

- "Chief Disciple" (Pāli: aggasāvaka; Sanskrit: agraśrāvaka): in the Pali canon, these are Sāriputta and (Mahā)moggallāna
- "Foremost Disciple" (Pāli: etadaggasāvaka; Sanskrit: etadagraśrāvaka): referring to those disciples who are recognized as the best in their respective attribute
- "Great Disciple" (Pāli: mahāsāvaka; Sanskrit: mahāśrāvaka): examples are Mahākassapa, Ānanda, Anuruddha and Mahākaccāna.
- "Ordinary Disciple" (Pāli: pakatisāvaka; Sanskrit: prakṛtiśrāvaka): constituting the majority of disciples, while devoted to the Buddha and his teaching and while having planted seeds for future liberation, they have not yet irreversibly entered the path to emancipation and are still subject to infinite rebirths.

==== Ariyasāvaka ====
In the Pali commentaries, the term ariyasāvaka is explained as "the disciple of the Noble One (i.e. Buddha)". Accordingly, Soma Thera and Thanissaro Bhikkhu translate this term as "The disciple of the Noble Ones"

However Bhikkhu Bodhi interprets this term as "noble disciple", and according to him, in the Pali suttas, this term is used in two ways:

1. broadly: any lay disciple of the Buddha;
2. narrowly: one who is at least on the path to enlightenment (Pāli: sotāpatti maggattha). In this sense, "ordinary people" (puthujjana) can be contrasted with this narrow definition of "noble disciple" (ariyasāvaka). Nyanatiloka writes, "sāvaka [...] refers, in a restricted sense (then mostly ariya-sāvaka, 'noble disciple'), only to the eight kinds of noble disciples (ariya-puggala, q.v.)."

The canon occasionally references the "four pairs" and "eight types" of disciples. This refers to disciples who have achieved one of the four stages of enlightenment:

- Sotāpanna
- Sakadāgāmin
- Anāgāmin
- Arahat

In regards to disciples achieving arahantship, Bhikkhu Bodhi writes:

In principle the entire practice of the Noble Eightfold Path is open to people from any mode of life, monastic or lay, and the Buddha confirms that many among his lay followers were accomplished in the Dhamma and had attained the first three of the four stages of awakening, up to nonreturning (anāgāmi; Theravāda commentators say that lay followers can also attain the fourth stage, arahantship, but they do so either on the verge of death or after attainment immediately seek the going forth [that is, homelessness, associated with becoming a monastic]).

For each of these stages, there is a "pair" of possible disciples: one who is on the stage's path (Pāli: magga); the other who has achieved its fruit (Pāli: phala). Thus, each stage represents a "pair" of individuals: the path traveler (Pāli: maggattha) and the fruit achiever (Pāli: phalattha). Hence, the community of disciples is said to be composed of four pairs or eight types of individuals (Pāli: cattāri purisayugāni attha purisapuggalā).(Sivaraksa 1993)

==== Foremost disciples ====
In the "Etadaggavagga" ("These are the Foremost Chapter," AN 1.188-267), the Buddha identifies 80 different categories for his "foremost" (Pāli: etadagga) disciples: 47 categories for monks, 13 for nuns, ten for laymen and ten for laywomen.

While the disciples identified with these categories are declared to be the Buddha's "foremost" or "chief" (Pāli: etadagga), this is different from his "Chief Disciples" (Pāli: aggasāvaka) who are consistently identified solely as Sāriputta and Mahāmoggallāna.

	The Buddha's Foremost Disciples (Based on AN 1.14)
CATEGORY	Bhikkhu	Bhikkhuni	Upāsaka	Upāsikā
Eldest	Kondañña	Mahāpajāpatī Gotamī	—	—
Great Wisdom	Sāriputta	Khemā	—	—
Psychic Powers	Mahāmoggallāna	Uppalavaṇṇā	—	—
Asceticism	Mahākassapa	—	—	—
Divine Eye	Anuruddha	Sakulā	—	—
High Clan	Bhaddiya Kāḷigodhāyaputta	—	—	—
Sweet Voice	Bhaddiya the Dwarf	—	—	—
Lion's Roar	Piṇḍolabhāradvāja	—	—	—
Dhamma Speaker	Puṇṇa Mantāṇiputta	Sakulā	Citta	—
Expounder	Mahākaccāyana	—	—	—
Mind-made Body	Cullapanthaka	—	—	—
Wholesome-Mind Development	Cullapanthaka	—	—	—
Wholesome-Perception Development	Mahāpanthaka	—	—	—
Free of Conflict	Subhūti	—	—	—
Worthy of Offerings	Subhūti	—	—	—
Forest-Dweller	Revata	—	—	—
Meditator	Kankhārevata	Sundarinandā	—	Uttarānandamātā
Energetic	Soṇa Koḷivisa	Soṇā	—	—
Beautiful Conversationalist	Soṇa Kuṭikaṇṇa	—	—	—
Receiver of Gifts	Sīvali	—	—	—
Inclined to Confidence	Vakkali	Singālamātā	—	—
Liking the Training	Rāhula	—	—	—
Confidence in Going-Forth	Raṭṭhapāla	—	—	—
First in Food Tickets	Kuṇḍadhāna	—	—	—
Extemporiser	Vaṅgīsa	—	—	—
Altogether Pleasing	Vaṅgantaputta	—	—	—
Assigner of Living Quarters	Dabba Mallaputta	—	—	—
Dear and Pleasing to Gods	Pilindavaccha	—	—	—
Speed in Knowledge	Bāhiya Dārucīriya	Bhaddā Kuṇḍalakesā	—	—
Beautiful Speaker	Kumārakassapa	—	—	—
Analytic Knowledge	Mahākoṭṭhita	—	—	—
Great Deep Knowledge	—	Bhaddakaccānā	—	—
Learned	Ānanda	—	—	Khujjuttarā
Mindful	Ānanda	—	—	—
Good Behavior	Ānanda	—	—	—
Courage	Ānanda	—	—	—
Attendant	Ānanda	—	—	—
Large Retinue	Uruvelā Kassapa	—	—	—
Pleasing to Families	Kāḷudāyī	—	—	—
Health	Bakkula	—	—	—
Recalling Past Lives	Sobhita	Bhaddā Kapilānī	—	—
Discipline	Upāli	Paṭācārā	—	—
Instructor of Monks	Mahākappina	—	—	—
Instructor of Nuns	Nandaka	—	—	—
Sense-Door Restraint	Nanda	—	—	—
Skilled in the Fire Element	Sāgata	—	—	—
Extemporising	Rādha	—	—	—
Wearing Coarse Robes	Mogharāja	Kisā Gotamī	—	—
First to Take Refuge	—	—	Tapusa and Bhalika	Sujātā
Supporter	—	—	Anāthapiṇḍaka	Visākhā
Four Bases of Sympathy	—	—	Hattha Āḷavaka	—
Loving-Kindness	—	—	—	Sāmāvatī
Excellent Alms Donor	—	—	Mahānāma	Suppavāsā
Attending with Medicinal Drink	—	—	—	Suppiyā
Pleasant Supporter	—	—	Ugga	—
Community Attendant	—	—	Uggata	—
Unwavering Faith	—	—	Sura Ambaṭṭha	Katiyānī
Individual with Faith	—	—	Jīvaka Komārabhacca	—
Confidence in the Traditions	—	—	—	Kāḷī
Trustworthy	—	—	Nakulapitu	Nakulamātā

In addition, in SN 17.23, SN 17.24 and AN 4.18.6, the Buddha identifies four pairs of disciples "who have no compare" and who should thus be emulated. These four pairs are a subset of the 80 foremost disciples listed above, identified in the sub-section 14 of AN 1 (i.e. AN 1.188-267). These four pairs of disciples to be most emulated are:

- monks: Sāriputta and Mahāmoggallāna
- nuns: Khemā and Uppalavaṇṇā
- laymen: Citta and Hatthaka of Alavi
- laywomen: Kujjuttara and Veḷukaṇḍakiyā

=== The community of disciples ===
In Buddhism, there are two main communities (Pāli: sangha):

- The "community of monks and nuns" (Pāli: bhikkhu-sangha; bhikkhuni-sangha) refers to a community of four or more monks or nuns who are living in a permanent or semi-permanent single-sex community (in the contemporary West monks and nuns may live within the same monastery but in separate living quarters). Within this community of monks and nuns there is a further sub-division containing practitioners (who are nonetheless still living among their fellow renunciates) possessed of some substantive level of realization (namely, those who have at least gained stream-entry). This core group is called the "noble sangha" (ariya-sangha).
- The "community of disciples" (Pāli: sāvaka-sangha) refers to the broad community of monks, nuns, and male and female layfollowers.

For an example of a traditional stock reference to the sāvaka-sangha in the Pali canon, in "The Crest of the Standard" discourse (SN 11.3), the Buddha advises his monks that, if they experience fear, they can recollect the Buddha or the Dhamma or the Sangha; and, in recollecting the Sangha they should recall:

"The Sangha of the Blessed One's disciples [sāvaka-sangha] is practising the good way, practising the straight way, practising the true way, practising the proper way; that is, the four pairs of persons, the eight types of individuals...."

A similar phrase can also be found in the lay disciple's daily chant, "Sangha Vandanā" ("Salutation to the Sangha").

=== Mahāyāna view ===
In Mahayana Buddhism, śrāvakas or arhats are sometimes contrasted negatively with bodhisattvas.

In the 4th century abhidharma work Abhidharmasamuccaya, Asaṅga describes those who follow the Śrāvakayāna. These people are described as having weak faculties, following the Śrāvaka Dharma, utilizing the Śrāvaka Piṭaka, being set on their own liberation, and cultivating detachment in order to attain liberation. Those in the Pratyekabuddhayāna are portrayed as also utilizing the Śrāvaka Piṭaka, are said to have medium faculties, to follow the Pratyekabuddha Dharma, and to be set on their own personal enlightenment. Finally, those in the Mahāyāna "Great Vehicle" are portrayed as utilizing the Bodhisattva Piṭaka, as having sharp faculties, following the Bodhisattva Dharma, and set on the perfection and liberation of all beings, and the attainment of complete enlightenment.

According to Vasubandhu's Yogacara teachings, there are four types of śrāvakas:

1. The fixed
2. The arrogant
3. The transformed
4. The converted (to "Bodhi" or Buddhism)

The transformed and the converted (Buddhist) are assured of eventual Nirvana in the Lotus Sutra.

According to Je Tsongkhapa, founder of the Gelug school of Tibetan Buddhism:

The Sutra on the Ten Levels (Daśabhūmika Sūtra) says that those who have cultivated these ten [virtuous practices, i.e. not killing, not stealing, not lying etc.] through fear of cyclic existence and without [great] compassion, but following the words of others, will achieve the fruit of a Śrāvaka.

— Lamrim Chenmo

== Jainism ==
A śrāvaka in Jainism is a lay Jain. He or she is the hearer of discourses of monastics and scholars, Jain literature. In Jainism, the Jain community is made up of four sections: monks, nuns, śrāvakas (laymen) and śrāvikās (laywomen).

The term śrāvaka has also been used as a shorthand for the community itself. For example, the Sarawagi are a Jain community originating in Rajasthan, and sometimes śrāvaka is the origin of surnames for Jain families. The long-isolated Jain community in East India is known as the Sarak.

The conduct of a śrāvaka is governed by texts called śrāvakācāras, the best known of which is the Ratnakaranda śrāvakācāra of Samantabhadra.

A śrāvaka rises spiritually through the eleven pratimas. After the eleventh step, he becomes a monk.

Jains follow six obligatory duties known as avashyakas: samayika (practising serenity), chaturvimshati (praising the tirthankara), vandan (respecting teachers and monks), pratikramana (introspection), kayotsarga (stillness), and pratyakhyana (renunciation).

== See also ==
- Sāvakabuddha
- Śrāvakayāna
- Arhat

== Bibliography ==
- Acharya, Kala (2002). Buddhānusmṛti: A Glossary of Buddhist Terms. Mumbai, New Delhi:Somaiya Publications. ISBN 81-7039-246-2. Available on-line at: http://ccbs.ntu.edu.tw/DBLM/resource/ebooks/102946/102946.htm.
- Bhikkhu Bodhi (2005). In the Buddha's Words: An Anthology of Discourses from the Pali Canon. Simon & Schuster. ISBN 978-0-86171-491-9.
- Bhikkhu Bodhi (2005b). The Connected Discourses of the Buddha: A New Translation of the Samyutta Nikaya. Wisdom Publications. ISBN 978-0-86171-973-0.
- Bodhi, Bhikkhu (ed.) (2005). In the Buddha's Words: An Anthology of Discourses from the Pāli Canon.Boston: Wisdom Pubs. ISBN 0-86171-491-1.
- Buddhaghosa; Ñāṇamoli (2011). The Path of Purification: Visuddhimagga (PDF). Shambhala Publications : distributed in the United States by Random House. ISBN 978-0-87773-079-8.
- Hecker (2003) NO CITATION
- Indaratana Maha Thera, Elgiriye (2002). Vandana: The Album of Pali Devotional Chanting and Hymns. Penang, Malaysia:Mahindarama Dhamma Publication. Available on-line at: http://www.buddhanet.net/pdf_file/vandana02.pdf.
- Nyanaponika; Hecker, Hellmuth (2012). Great Disciples of the Buddha: Their Lives, Their Works, Their Legacy. Simon & Schuster. ISBN 978-0-86171-864-1.
- Nyanatiloka (2004). Buddhist Dictionary: Manual of Buddhist Terms and Doctrines. Buddhist Publication Society. ISBN 978-955-24-0019-3.
- Pali Text Society (PTS) (1921–1925). The Pali Text Society's Pali-English dictionary. London: Chipstead. Available on-line at: http://dsal.uchicago.edu/dictionaries/pali/.
- Prayudh Payutto (1986). Sangha: The Ideal World Community. in Sivaraksa, Sulak (1993). Buddhist Perception for Desirable Societies in the Future: Papers Prepared for the United Nations University. Thai Inter-Religious Commission for Development, Sathirakoses-Nagapradipa Foundation.
- Thanissaro Bhikkhu (trans., 2006a). Metta Sutta: Good Will (1) (AN 4.125). Available on-line at: http://www.accesstoinsight.org/tipitaka/an/an04/an04.125.than.html.
- Thanissaro Bhikkhu (trans., 2006b). Metta Sutta: Good Will (2) (AN 4.126). Available on-line at: http://www.accesstoinsight.org/tipitaka/an/an04/an04.126.than.html.
- Thanissaro Bhikkhu (trans., 1997). Sabbasava Sutta: All the Fermentations (MN 2). Available on-line at: http://www.accesstoinsight.org/tipitaka/mn/mn.002.than.html.
- Uppalavanna, Sister (trans.) (n.d.-a). Aayācanāsuttam: Wishing (AN 4.18.6). Retrieved from "MettaNet" at http://www.metta.lk/tipitaka/2Sutta-Pitaka/4Anguttara-Nikaya/Anguttara2/4-catukkanipata/018-sacetaniyavaggo-e.html.
- Uppalavanna, Sister (trans.) (n.d.-b). Etadaggavagga: These are the foremost (AN 1.14). Retrieved from "MettaNet" at http://www.metta.lk/tipitaka/2Sutta-Pitaka/4Anguttara-Nikaya/Anguttara1/1-ekanipata/014-Etadaggapali-e.html. A Romanized Pali version of this chapter is available from this same site at http://www.metta.lk/tipitaka/2Sutta-Pitaka/4Anguttara-Nikaya/Anguttara1/1-ekanipata/014-Etadaggapali-p.html.
- Webu Sayadaw & Roger Bischoff (trans.) (1995). "A Happiness that Ever Grows" in The Essential Practice (Part II). Available on-line at: http://www.accesstoinsight.org/lib/authors/webu/wheel384.html#happy.
