= Uttarānandamātā =

Female disciple of the Buddha who is foremost in abiding in dhyāna

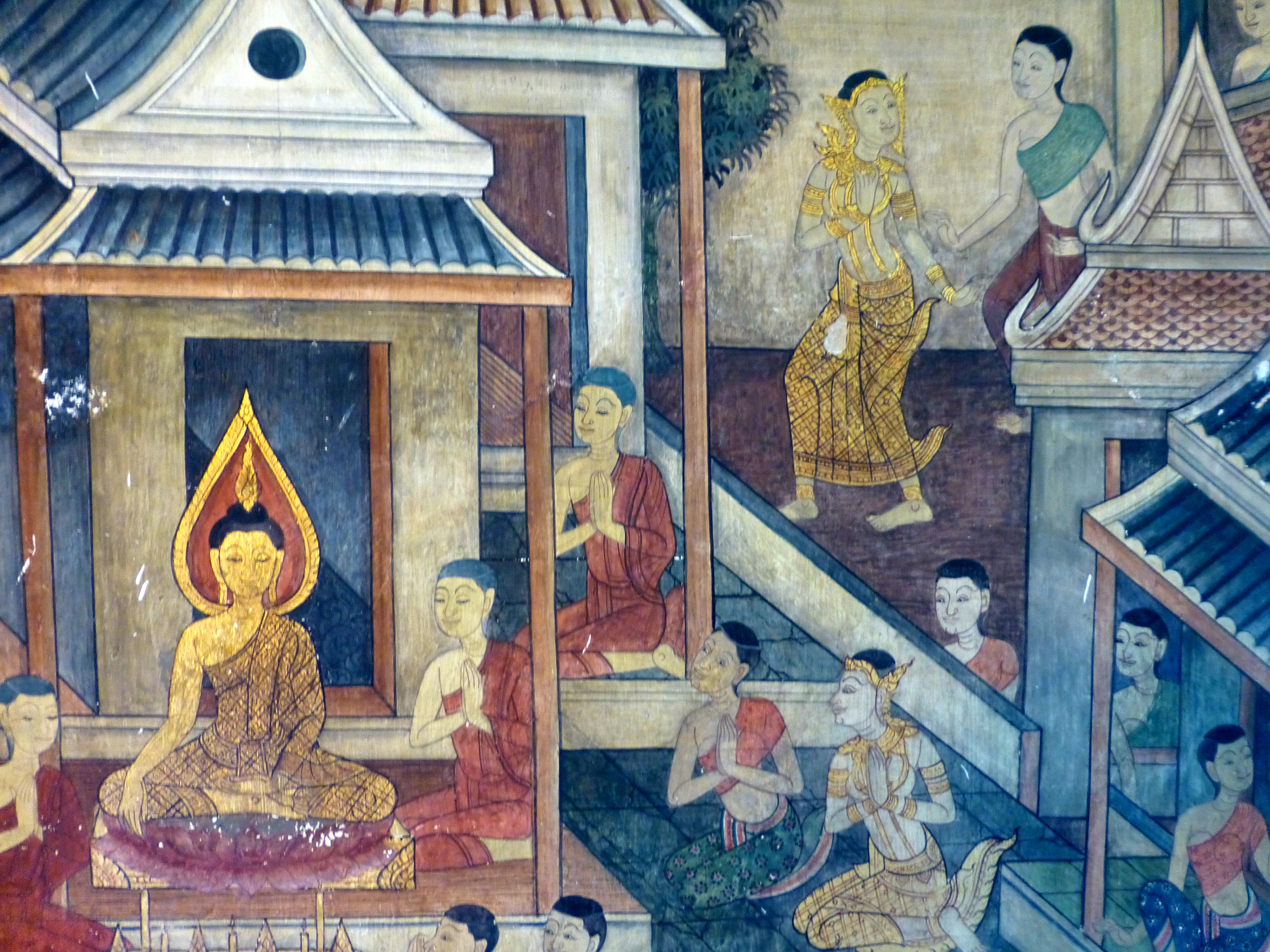
- Visakha, Wat Pho, Bangkok, Thailand
- Title: Chief Female Disciple

Personal life
- Born: 6th century BCE Rājagaha, Magadha
- Spouse: Sumana
- Other name: Uttarā

Religious life
- Religion: Buddhism
- Profession: Upāsikā

Senior posting
- Teacher: Gautama Buddha

Uttarānandamātā was a laywoman and chief disciple of the Buddha. She is foremost among women disciples in meditative absorption. She is also referred to simply as Uttarā, with "Uttarānandamātā" used to make a distinction between other disciples with the same name.

She is included in a list of eminent laywomen who observed uposatha and the eight precepts

== Biography ==
=== Past life ===
According to the Buddhavaṃsa, the future Uttarā Nandamātā was born into a rich family in the city of Haṃsāvatī, during the time of Padumuttara Buddha. While she was listening to a discourse given by that Buddha, she witnessed him proclaim a female lay disciple as the foremost among those who dwelt in jhāna. She aspired for the same distinction in a future existence and expressed her wish to the Buddha, who predicted that her aspiration would be fulfilled.

=== Early life ===
The Aṅguttara Nikāya Commentary states that Uttarā Nandamātā was born during the lifetime of Gotama Buddha as the daughter of Puṇṇasīha (also known as Puṇṇa or Puṇṇaka), a servant of a seṭṭhi named Sumana from Rājagaha. Her mother’s name was Uttarā.

Puṇṇasīha became a wealthy merchant (dhanaseṭṭhi) after obtaining immense wealth due to the merit he received for providing a meal to Sāriputta. He provided alms for the Buddha and his monks for seven days. On the seventh day, after the Buddha gave a sermon on appreciation for his charity, Puṇṇasīha, his wife and daughter, all became Sotāpannas.

=== Marriage ===
Sumana asked for Uttarā's hand in marriage for his son, but his request was refused because Sumana's family were not Buddhist. Puṇṇasīha informed Sumana that Uttarā was a disciple of the Buddha and offered flowers daily, costing one kahāpana. Sumana responded that Uttarā should be given flowers worth two kahāpanas. Puṇṇasīha agreed and Uttarā was married.

After several unsuccessful attempts to obtain her husband's permission to keep the uposatha fast, as she had done in her parents' house, she received fifteen thousand kahāpanas from her father and used this wealth to purchase the services of a prostitute named Sirimā, Jīvaka’s sister, to look after her husband for a fortnight. He soon relented and gave her consent to uphold the uposatha observance for that period.

=== Sirimā’s jealousy ===
On the final day of her fast, Uttarā was busy preparing alms for the Buddha. Her husband and Sirimā saw her and smiled, thinking that she was a fool for working among the servants and not enjoying her wealth. Uttarā in turn, smiled at the thought of his ignorance in believing that his life of comfort would last.

Sirimā, thinking that husband and wife were smiling at each other, became enraged with jealousy. She took a ladle filled with boiling oil and poured it over Uttarā's head. But at this point, Uttarā was absorbed in meditation on loving-kindness, feeling compassion for Sirimā, so the oil did not harm her. A servant accosted Sirimā for her behavior, and she realized the seriousness of her actions. She begged Uttarā for forgiveness, who responded by saying that she would first need to obtain forgiveness from her spiritual father, the Buddha.

The two approached the Buddha, who forgave Sirimā and gave a discourse on the appreciation of food. He then stated the following verse from the Dhammapada (Verse 223):

Conquer the angry one by loving-kindness;
Conquer the wicked one by goodness;
Conquer the stingy one by generosity;
Conquer the liar by speaking the truth.

After the discourse, Sirimā became a Sotāpanna.

=== Death ===
After her death, Uttarā was born in a vimāna in Tāvatiṃsa.

Moggallāna saw her in one of his visits to Tāvatiṃsa and related her story the Buddha.

== Literature ==
The Vimānavatthu Commentary and the Dhammapada Commentary give a slight variation to the story above. According to these versions, at the end of the Buddha's discourse to Sirimā, Uttarā became a Sakadāgāmī and her husband and father-in-law became Sotāpannas.

Her son Nanda is never mentioned. It has been suggested by Thomas William Rhys Davids that Uttarā Nandamātā may be identical with Velukantakīnandamātā, but others disagree.

Uttarā also appears in Chapter 9 of the Visuddhimagga to provide an example for the argument that fire cannot harm the body of a person who abides in loving-kindness.

== See also ==
- Kṣamā - Sanskrit word for "forgiveness."
- Repentance
