= Āṭavaka =

Yaksha

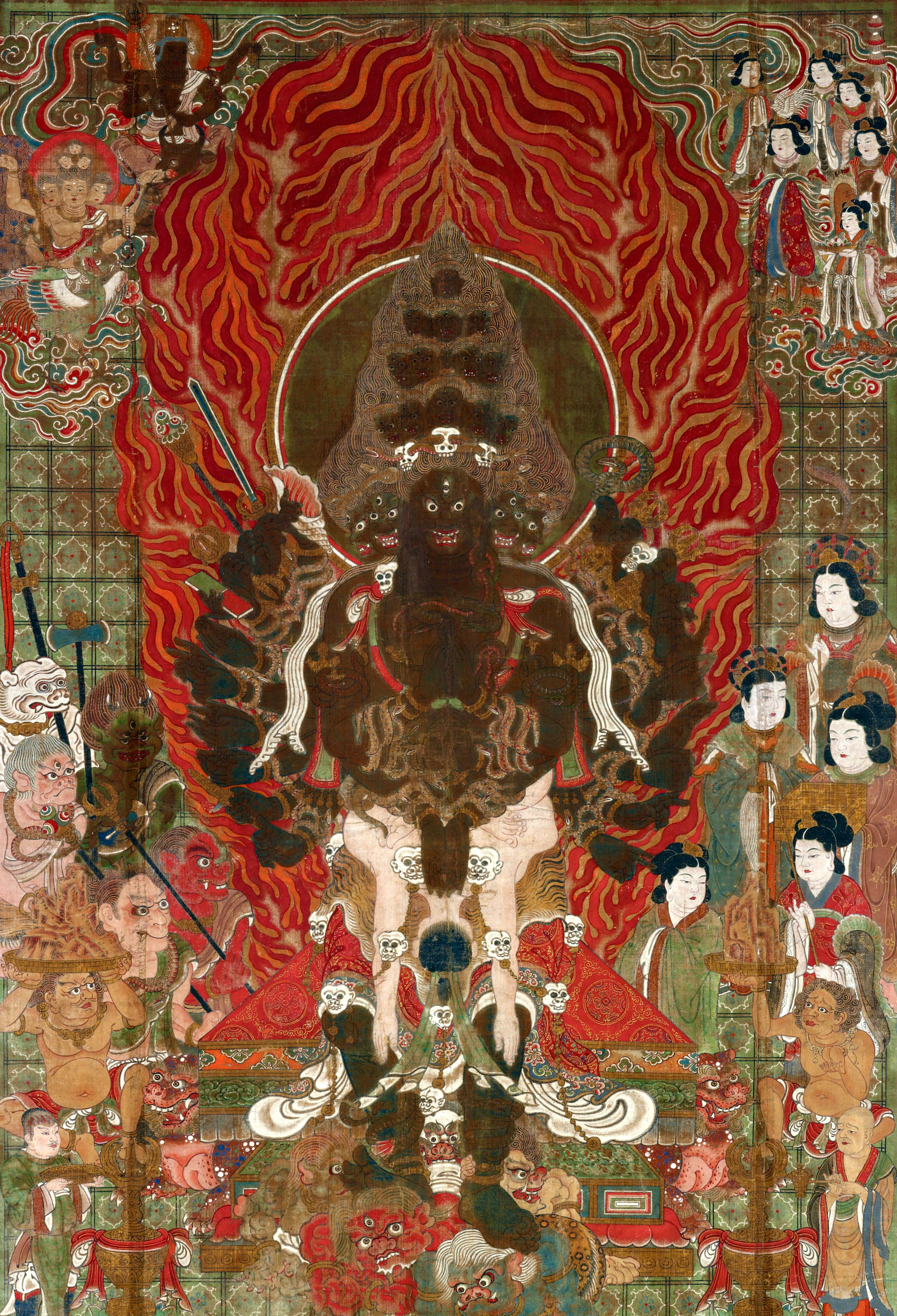
- Sanskrit: आटवक; Āṭavaka
- Pāli: आळवक; Āḷavaka
- Burmese: အာဠဝကဘီလူး
- Chinese: 大元帥明王 (Pinyin: Dàyuánshuài Míngwáng) 無比力夜叉 (Pinyin: Wúbǐlì Yèchā) 阿吒嚩迦 (Pinyin: Āzhàpójiā) 曠野鬼神大將 (Pinyin: Kuàngyě Guǐshén Dàjiāng)
- Japanese: 大元帥明王 (romaji: Daigensui Myōō) 無比力夜叉 (romaji: Muhiriki Yasha) 阿吒嚩迦 (romaji: Atabaka) 曠野鬼神大将 (romaji: Kōya Kishin Taishō)
- Korean: 대원수명왕 (RR: Daewonsu Myeongwang)
- Thai: อาฬวกยักษ์ Alawaka Yak
- Tibetan: 'Brog gnas
- Vietnamese: Đại Nguyên Soái Minh Vương; A Tra Bà Câu

Information
- Venerated by: Theravāda: (Ātānātiya Sutta); (Āḷavaka Sutta) (SN 10.12, SN 1.10); Mahāyāna: (Golden Light Sutra) (金光明最勝王經); (Buddhadhyāna Samādhisāgara Sūtra) (觀佛三昧海經 T0643); (Mahāmāyūrividyārājñī Sūtra)) (孔雀王呪經 T0988); (Āṭavaka Dhāraṇī Sūtra) (阿吒婆拘鬼神大將上佛陀羅尼經 T1238), etc.; Other: (Great Tang Records on the Western Regions)
- Attributes: Protection against enemies Protection against calamities, etc.

Āṭavaka (Sanskrit; Pali: Āḷavaka) is a popular figure in Buddhism. He is considered the most powerful earthly yakṣa at the time of the Buddha and regarded as a Wisdom King in esoteric tradition.

== Origin Story ==
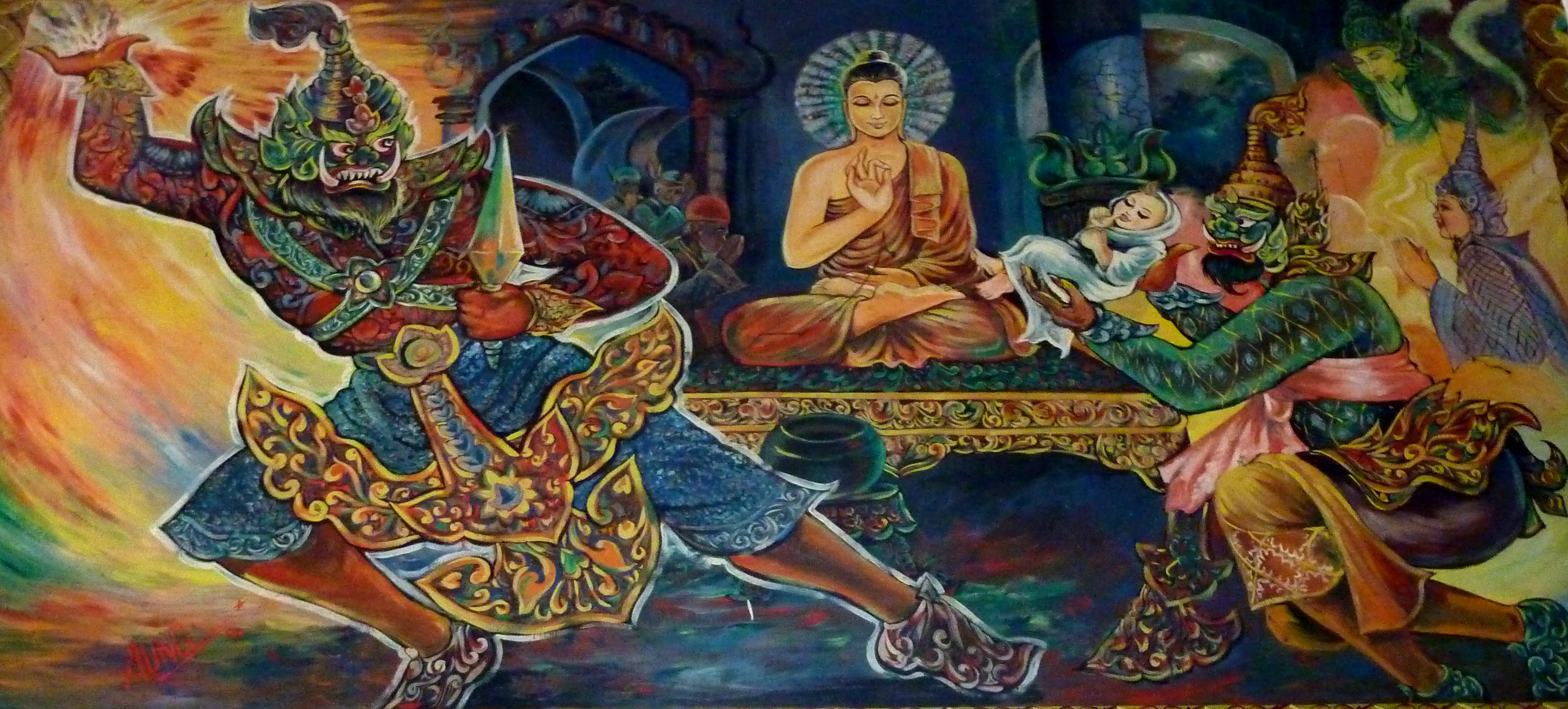
The defeat of Āṭavaka. Modern Burmese depiction.

=== Introduction ===
The Pali Canon provides the story of Āṭavaka as follows:

At the time of the Buddha, Āṭavaka was a man-eating yakṣa that lived deep in the forest of Āṭavī. One day, the king of Āṭavī was hunting in the forest. On his way back to the palace, he passed under a large banyan tree where Āṭavaka dwelt. The yakṣa was granted permission by King Vaiśravaṇa that he could seize and devour anyone who came within the shadow of his abode. In exchange for his life, the king, along with his ministers and the mayor Nagaraguttika, made a promise to provide the demon with the bodies of captured criminals as food.

Of Āṭavaka's many powers, one was that a glance at him could make one's body as soft as butter. It eventually came to pass that due to a shortage of criminals, each household in the vicinity was forced to sacrifice one child to satiate the demon. Pregnant women fled the capital until twelve years later, the only child left was the king's own son Āṭavaka Kumāra. The king dressed his son for the occasion of sacrifice. The Buddha, using his power of clairvoyance, saw the potential outcome of the situation and hastened to the yakṣa's lair.

=== Confrontation ===
While Āṭavaka was away with an assembly of yakṣas in the Himalayas, the Buddha was greeted by his doorkeeper Gadrabha. Gadrabha warned the Buddha of the demon's wrathful nature, but the Buddha fearlessly entered Āṭavaka's abode and sat upon his throne.

Gadrabha traveled to the Himalayas to inform Āṭavaka what had happened. Meanwhile, the Buddha was teaching Dharma to Āṭavaka's womenfolk. The yakṣas Śatagiri and Haimavata were also on their way to the assembly in the Himalayas and became aware of the Buddha's presence by their inability to fly directly over him. They flew down to venerate the Buddha before continuing on their journey.

When Āṭavaka heard from Gadrabha, Śatagiri and Haimavata of the Buddha's presence, he placed his left foot on Manosilātala and his right foot on Kelāsakūta, both localities in the Himalayas, which suggests that the yakṣa grew to an enormous size. He cried out his name aloud and hurried back to his palace. Despite his various supernormal powers, he was unsuccessful at dislodging the Buddha from his throne. Even his ultimate weapon; the cloth Dussāvudha, one of the four most powerful weapons in the world; was of no effect. When he hurled it, it simply fell at the Buddha's feet as a rug.

=== Āṭavaka's Questions ===
Āṭavaka finally asked the Buddha to leave. The Buddha complied. The demon then summoned him to return, which the Buddha did. To and fro the Buddha went at Āṭavaka's command until the fourth time, when the Buddha refused to obey.

Āṭavaka's proposed a set of questions to the Buddha, claiming that if he was unable to answer, he would possess his mind, rip out his heart, or hurl him by the feet across the Ganges river. Although there are a total of thirteen questions, they are usually grouped together as eight. In question and answer format, these are as follows:

1) What is a person’s highest wealth?

Conviction is a person's highest wealth.

2) What when well-practiced, brings bliss?

Dharma, when well-practiced, brings bliss.

3) What is the highest of savors?

Truth is the highest of savors.

4) Living in what way is one’s life called the best?

Living with discernment, one's life is called best.

5) How does one cross over the flood?

Through conviction one crosses over the flood.

6) How does one cross over the sea?

Through heedfulness, one crosses over the sea.

7) How does one overcome suffering & stress?

Through persistence one overcomes suffering & stress.

8) How is a person purified?

Through discernment a person is purified.

9) How does one gain discernment?

Convinced of the arhats’ Dharma for attaining unbinding,—heedful, observant—one listening well gains discernment.

10) How does one find wealth?

Doing what’s fitting, enduring burdens, one with initiative finds wealth.

11) How does one attain honor?

Through truth one attains honor.

12) How does one bind friends to oneself?

Giving binds friends to oneself.

13) Passing from this world to the next world, how does one not grieve?

Endowed with these four qualities,—truth, self-control, stamina, relinquishment (cāga)—a householder of conviction, on passing away, doesn’t grieve.

=== Conversion ===
After his questions were answered, the yakṣa, amazed at the Buddha's wisdom and righteousness, became a śrotāpanna. The Commentary (SnA.i.228) states that Āṭavaka's parents had prepared these questions and their answers from Kāśyapa Buddha and taught them to their son. He had them written on a gold leaf with red paint to be stored in his palace. The answers the Buddha gave were identical to those given by Kāśyapa Buddha.

At dawn, the king's men arrived with the young prince prepared for sacrifice as food for Āṭavaka. They hear the yakṣa shout with joy upon hearing the Buddha's teachings. When they offered the boy to the demon who in turn handed him over to the Buddha. The Buddha blessed the boy and handed him back to the king's men. This boy was then known as Hastaka Āṭavaka, who became one of the foremost lay disciples of the Buddha.

Upon learning of the demon's conversion, the king and the citizens of Āṭavī built for him a special residence near that of Vaiśravaṇa, where they provided him with gifts of flowers, scents, and more.

== Mahāyāna ==
The Mahāyāna tradition recognizes Āṭavaka as a Wisdom King and one of the Eight Great Yakṣa Generals of Vaiśravaṇa. A common title is Āṭavaka Mahāyakṣasenāpati (Sanskrit; lit. “Great Yakṣa General Āṭavaka”).

In East Asia, he is commonly known as 大元帥明王 (Chinese: Dàyuánshuài Míngwáng; Japanese: Daigensui Myōō; lit. "Generalissimo Wisdom King"), though many other names and translations exist.

Images of Āṭavaka vary, but he is commonly depicted with one head and four arms, four heads and eight arms, six heads and eight arms, eighteen heads and thirty six arms, etc. He is often blue, black or red in color and wields a sword, vajra, and other items. He has a countenance of wrath and a body enveloped by flame, which is common to other Wisdom Kings. He is sometimes seen with Nāgas encircling his arms and legs.

=== Japan ===
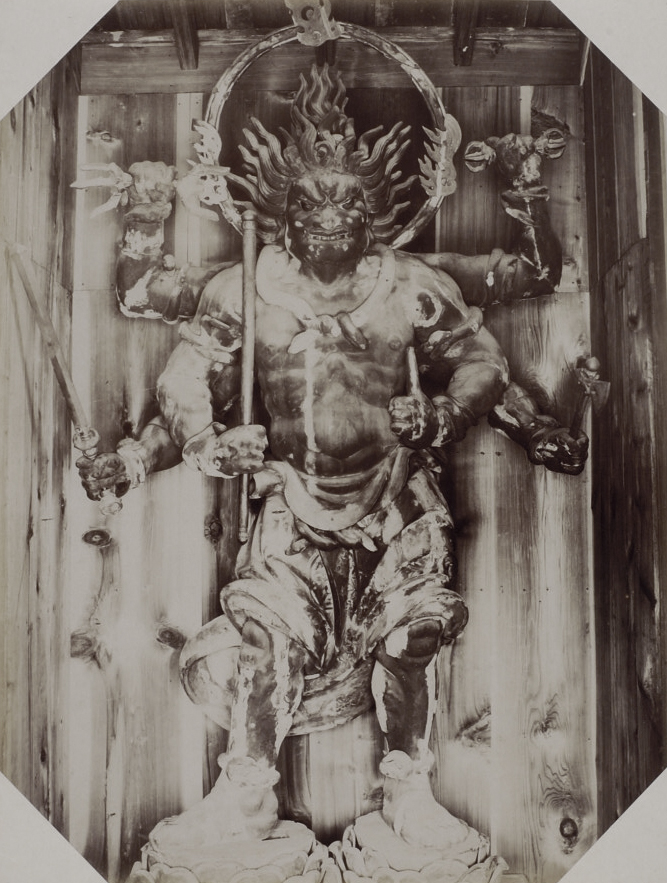
Daigensui Myōō (Akishinodera)

Daigensui Myōō is venerated as a protector of the nation from foreign enemies as well as natural disasters. In ancient times, the Japanese Imperial Court held a ceremony from the eighth to fourteenth days of the first month called Taigen[sui] no hō (大元帥の法; lit. Law of Āṭavaka) to ward off calamities. In January, 1945, several Shingon monks performed Goma rituals dedicated to Daigensui Myōō to curse the U.S. President Franklin D. Roosevelt. Roosevelt died three months later, which the monks claimed was due to their rituals.

==== Temples ====
Below is a non-exhaustive list of temples and shrines at which Daigensui Myōō is enshrined:

- Akishino-dera (秋篠寺) in Nara Prefecture
- Rishō-in (理性院: A sub-temple of Daigo-ji) in Kyōto
- Daigen-dō (太元堂) at Tō-ji (東寺) in Kyōto
- Kyōzen-ji (京善寺) in Ōsaka
- Jikō-in (慈光院) in Toyama Prefecture
- Tamura Jinja (田村神社) in Fukushima Prefecture

=== Mantra and Dhāraṇī ===
Several esoteric practices fall under Āṭavaka's jurisdiction and include several mantras and dhāraṇīs. Some are as follows:

Mantra

- Namo tariḥ taburiḥ bhara buriḥ śakyame śakyame trasaddhāṃ uyaṃvi svāhā

Mantras for protection

- Duru mi, duru mi, dhami dhami, dhuru mi, dhuru mi, dhuru mi, dhuru mi, duru mili, nili nili nili, nala nala nala, nili nili nili nili, nalanupulini, duluchanāṃ dulichanāṃ, kuṭanāṃ kuṭanāṃ, mahā-kuṭanāṃ kuṭanāṃ, taṭanāṃ mahā-taṭanāṃ, taṭanāṃ, ṭaṭa ṭaṭa, mahā-ṭaṭa ṭaṭa, abhi abhi, mahā-abhi, abhili abhili, mahā-abhili abhili, apa-abhi apa-abhi apa-abhi, luśi luśi mahā-luśi luśi, lini lini mahā-lini, śulu śulu mahā-śulu śulu, kulu kulu mahā-kulu kulu, lukumu lukumu lukumu lukumu, kuma kuma kuma kuma, śili śili śili śili, iṭi iṭi iṭi iṭi, viṭi viṭi viṭi viṭi, hala hala hala hala, śini śini śini śini, śune śune śune śune, hini hini hini hini, hana hana hana hana, maṇi maṇi maṇi maṇi, mahā-maṇi maṇi, sala sala sala sala, śrī kuru, akarṣa, sina sina sina sina, mosa bhana mokṣaka dhuka muṇi, kamala kamala kamala, jakṭitaja, śama dhama śama dhama, yama dhama yama dhama, śama mukta miti, nabhala dhuna me, puruṣa dhama muṇi, nabhi dhuna me, tuja dhuta muṇi, nabhi dhuna me, svāhā
- Akṣa akṣa, maṇi maṇi, mahā-maṇi maṇi, anuṇiśuśu, mahā-nāgaśuśu, duḥkhanaci aho, akhanaṭi atanaṭi, aṭa aṭa aṭa, naṭa naṭa, ludu ludu ludu, śuśu dulu, śini śini śini śini, ukuma kuma kuma kuma, śili śili śili śilini, nili nili mahā-nili, svāhā

Defense against evil

- Lumo lumo, luma luma luma, śili śili śili śili śili, kuna kuna kuna kuna kuna kuna, kuno kuno kuno, kulu kulu kulu kulu, śulu śulu śulu śulu śulu, śili muśu, muśili muśili muśili muśili, śumo śumo śumo, śuma śumiti, mamise, ma atikala, mitu, svāhā

The Āṭavaka Dhāraṇī Sūtra (T. 1238) contains several more dhāraṇīs as well as several seals (印, pinyin: yìn) and talismans (符, pinyin: fú) that serve different purposes.

== Character ==
The shout Āṭavaka cried before facing the Buddha is held by tradition to be one of the four shout heard throughout Jambudvīpa. His weapon, the Dussāvudha, is also known as one of the four most powerful weapons in the world. If he threw it up into the sky, no rain would fall for twelve years; if he let it fall on the earth, all plants and trees would die and nothing would grow for twelve years; if he threw it into the sea, the sea would completely dry up; it could make Sineru crumble into pieces. The others are:

- Śakra's Vajra
- Vaiśravaṇa's Gadāvudha
- Yama's Nayanāvudha

He is also listed among the yakṣas in the Atānātiya Sutta to be called upon by Buddhists for protection.

== Literary motif ==
Professor Kaigyoku Watanabe has identified the story of Āṭavaka as among the class of Kalmāsapāda stories, in which three main themes are central:

1) A man-eating yakṣa
2) A king who saves himself by offering a boon to the yakṣa
3) The conversion of the yakṣa

== See also ==
- Hevajra
- Bakasura
- Saint George and the Dragon
