= Akishino-dera =

Buddhist temple in Nara, Nara, Japan

- 秋篠寺
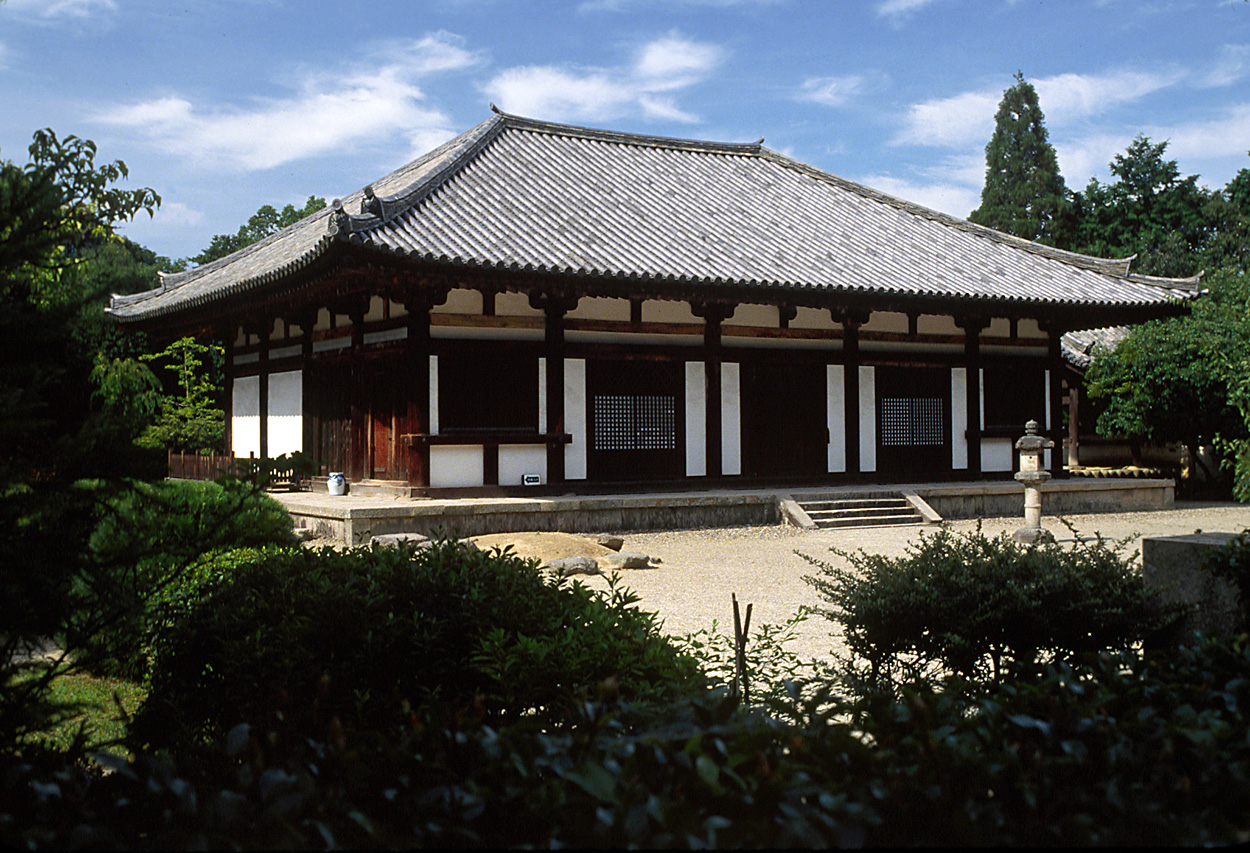
- Main Hall (NT)

- Location within Nara Prefecture Location within Japan

Religion
- Affiliation: Buddhist
- Deity: Yakushi Nyorai
- Rite: Independent
- Status: functional

Location
- Location: 757 Akishino-chō, Nara-shi, Nara-ken
- Interactive map of Akishino-dera
- Coordinates: 34°42′11.38″N 135°46′32.32″E

Architecture
- Founder: c. Zenjū
- Completed: c.776
- National Treasure National Important Cultural Property

Akishino-dera (秋篠寺) is a Buddhist temple located in the city of Nara, Nara Prefecture Japan. It does not belong to any sect of Japanese Buddhism and has no "mountain name". Its honzon is a statue of Yakushi Nyorai . It is known for its statue of Gigeiten (Goddess of Arts and Performing Arts).

== History ==
Akishino-dera is said to have been founded by Zenjū Daitoku (善珠大徳), younger brother of Emperor Shōmu, a monk of the Hossō sect, and is also said to have been the family temple of the local powerful Akishino clan, but the exact date and circumstances of its founding are unknown. According to the Legends of Akishino-dera (秋篠寺縁起), Zenjū founded the temple in 776 at the request of Emperor Kōnin, who had deposed and caused the deaths of Empress Inoue and her son, Crown Prince Otobe, but this account dates from 1139. The earliest documented mention of Akishino-dera is in the Shoku Nihongi, which states that in 780 (Hōki 11), Emperor Kōnin bestowed a grant of 100 households (jikifu) upon the temple, indicating its founding before this year (jikifu was a grant of land tax and labor tax collected from households in a certain area, used for salaries, temple maintenance, etc.). The Records of the Kōfuku-ji Kanmu (輿福寺官務牒疏) of 1441 dates its foundation instead to 776. According to the Nihon Kōki, the 59th-day memorial service for Emperor Kanmu, who died in 806, was held at Akishino-dera, indicating its close ties to the imperial family. During the Heian period, Akishino-dera became a Shingon sect temple, and from the late Heian period onwards, its temple territory increased, leading to frequent disputes over land with Saidai-ji, located to the south.

Excavated Nara-period tiles corroborate an eighth-century foundation date. Like other major temples of the period, Akishino-dera had two pagodas, as well as a Kondō.

According to the Legends, a fire in June 1135 destroyed most of the temple. Two hundred and fifty-five ofuda, dating from 1327 to 1524, cast light on later years. The existing Main Hall (National Treasure) stands on the site of the former lecture hall, but it is not the original structure, but a reconstruction from the Kamakura period.

In 1595, Toyotomi Hideyoshi granted the temple a land grant of 100 koku. After the Meiji era, the temple changed its sect to the Jōdō-shū Buddhism, but it is now an independent temple.

Outside the south gate is the former guardian shrine, Hachisho Goryū Shrine, which enshrines eight deities, including Prince Sawara. Currently, the main entrance to the temple is the east gate, but the original main gate was the south gate. Between the south gate and the main hall, amidst a grove of trees and a moss garden, are the remains of the main hall and the east and west pagodas, with their foundation stones still remaining.

== Gallery ==
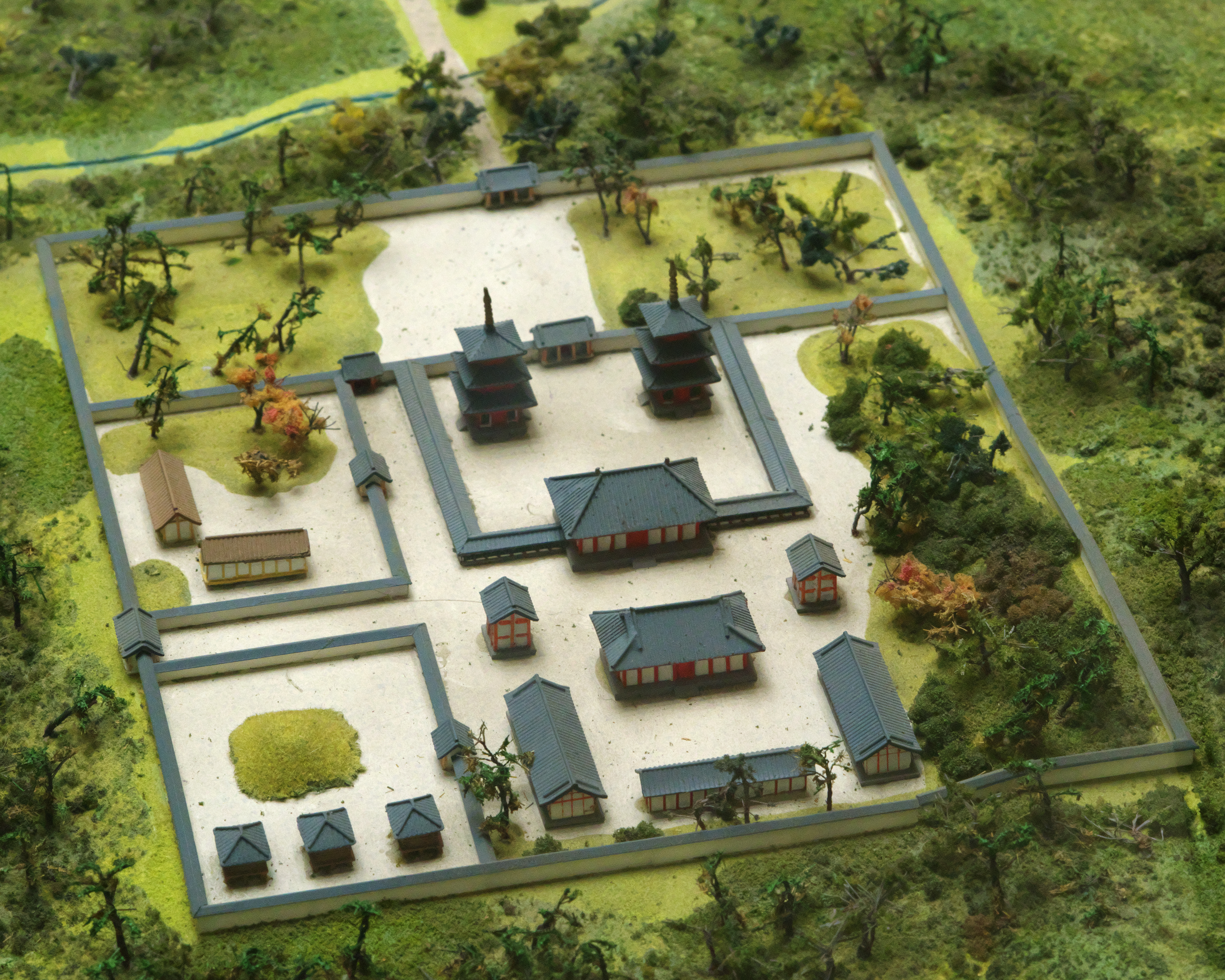
Model of Akishino-dera in the Nara period

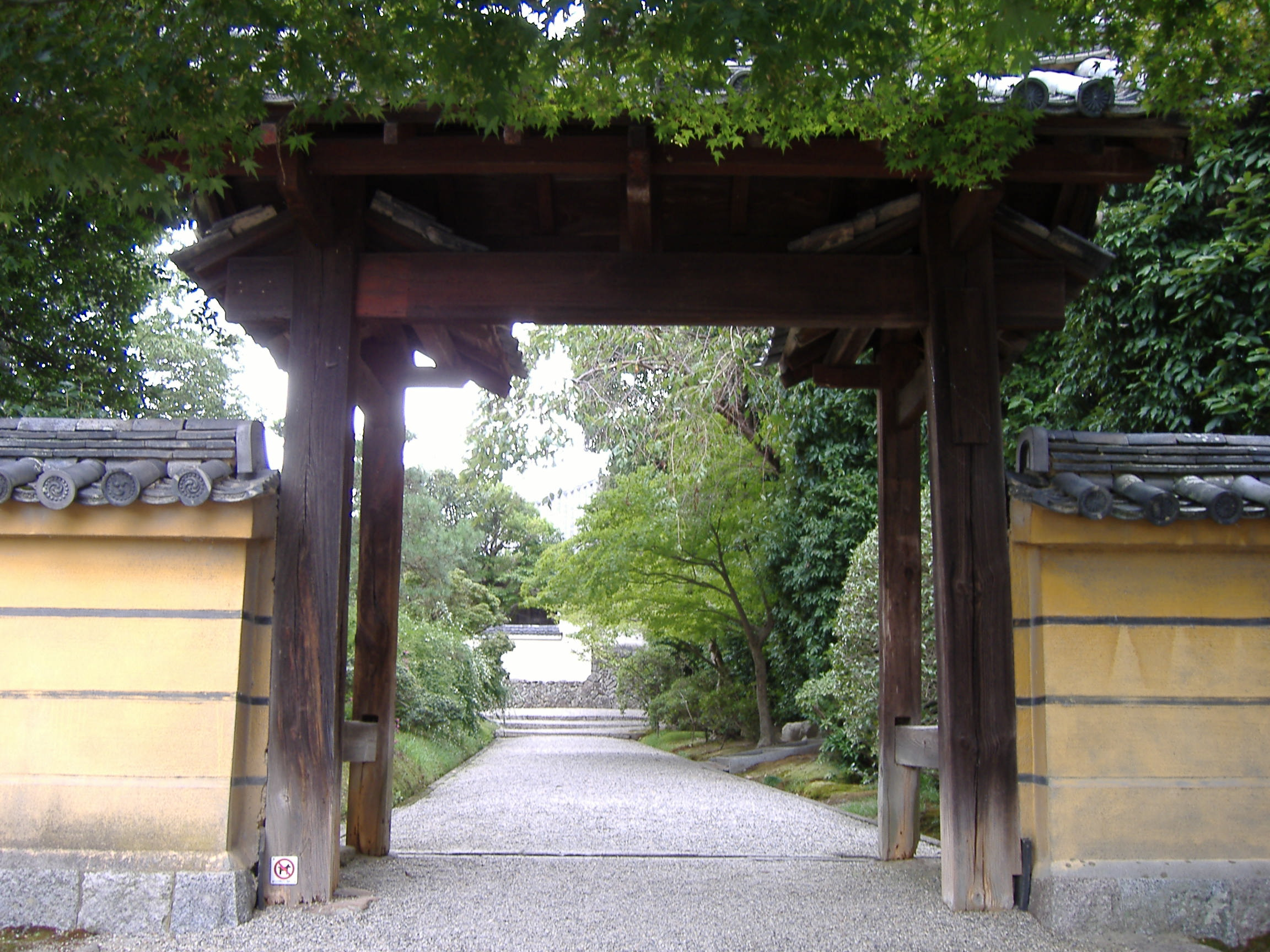
East Gate

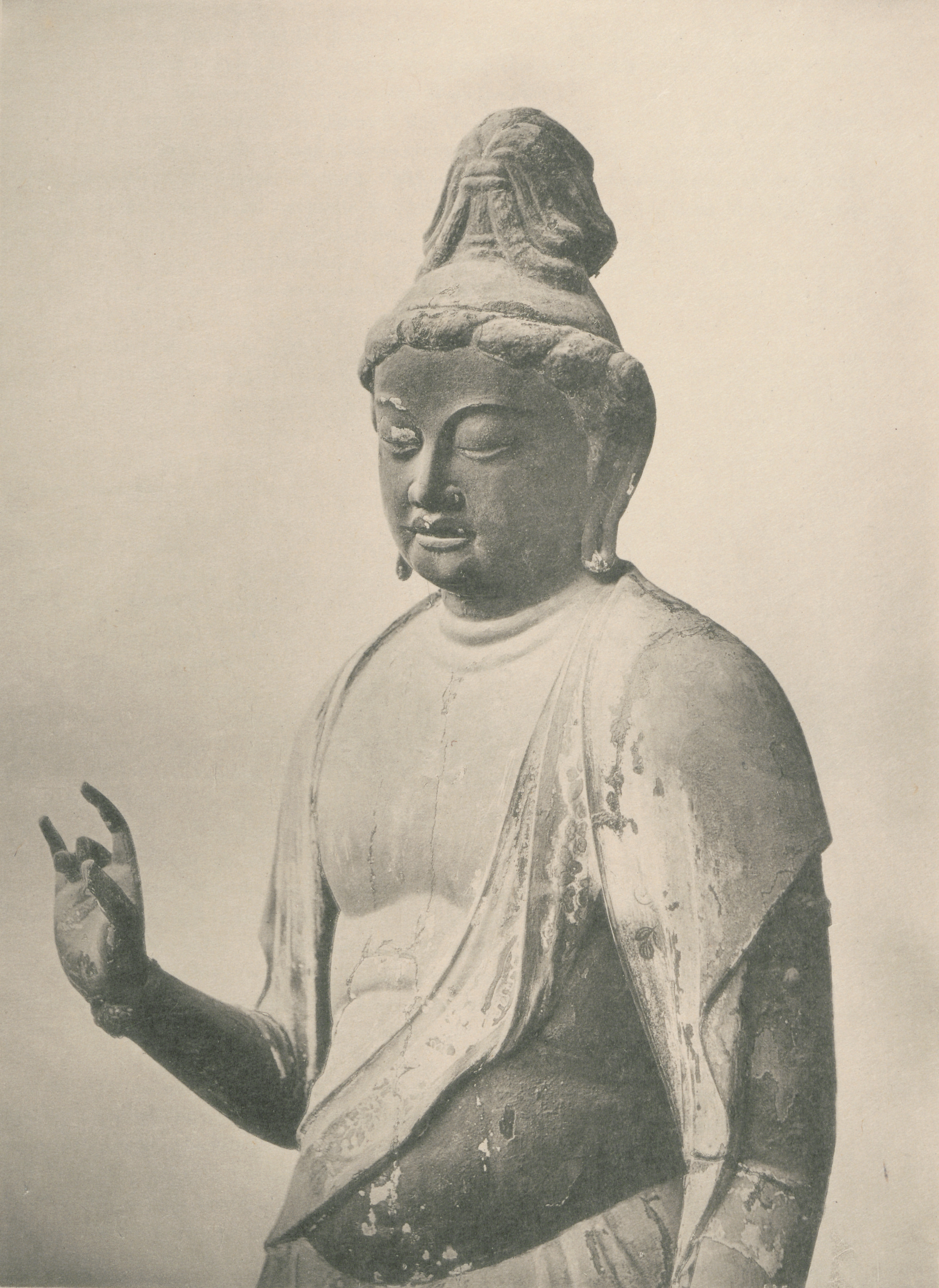
Gigeiten (ICP)

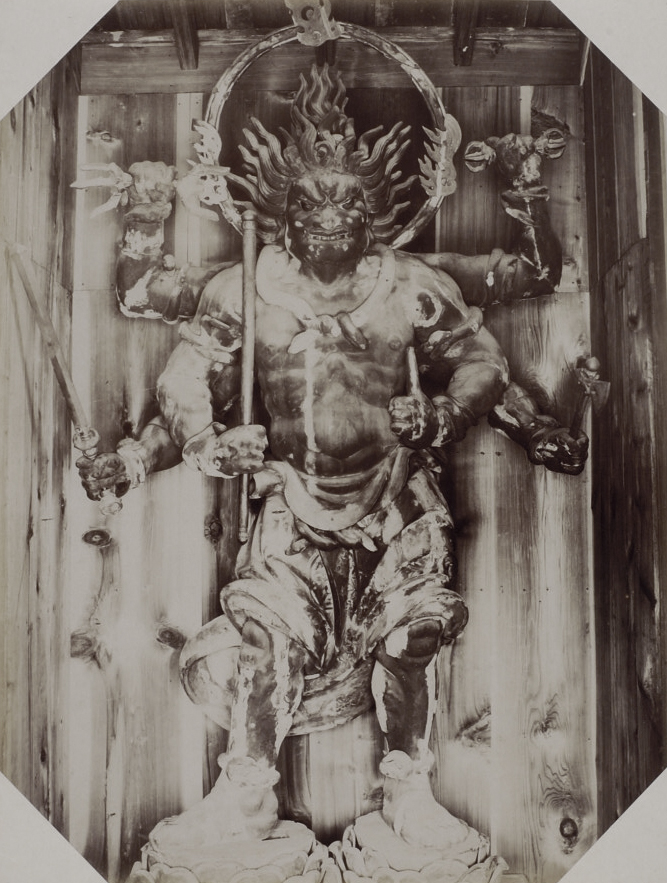
Daigensui Myōō (ICP)

== Cultural Properties ==
=== National Treasure ===
- Hondō (本堂), Kamakura period. Constructed on the site of the lecture hall, this structure is one of the representative works of Japanese-style Buddhist temples of that time. The building has five bays in length (front) and four bays in width (side). with a raised platform, earthen floor, tiled hipped roof, and slightly narrower intercolumniation at each end, epitomises the Wayō style. There is no veranda around the hall, and the interior is an earthen floor without a raised floor. The five bays at the front have lattice doors in the central three bays and latticed windows in the bays at both ends. The overall structure is conservative and simple, and although it is a reconstruction from the Kamakura period, it exhibits a style reminiscent of Nara period architecture. In Japanese architecture, the principle is to use lintels and not tie beams except for the head tie beams above the pillars, but in this building, an inner tie beam is used below the inner lintel, and new techniques are employed, such as inserting the interior connecting beams into the pillars on the main hall side. Furthermore, the presence of wind erosion marks on the pillars inside the building suggests that, at the time of its construction, the front of the building (5 bays wide on each side and 1 bay deep) was left open without walls or fittings. The Hondō was dismantled for repair and reconstruction in 1899.

=== Important Cultural Properties ===
- Wooden statue of seated Yakushi Nyorai and two attendants (木造薬師如来及両脇侍像), Muromachi period / late Heian period. This is the principal image of the temple. While the central Yakushi Nyorai is made of plain wood, the attendant statues of Nikko Bosatsu and Gekko Bosatsu are painted and have different styles, indicating they are not originally a set. The central Yakushi Nyorai sits on an archaic drapery rather than a lotus pedestal. It is believed to be a revival work from around the Muromachi period. The two attendant statues are thought to be from the late Heian period, and their appearance suggests they may have originally been made as Brahma and Indra statues.
- Wooden statue of standing Gigeiten (木造伝・伎芸天立像), Nara period (head), Kamakura period (body). This 206.0-cm is located at the far left of the main hall's altar. The head was made in the Nara period using the dry lacquer technique, and the body was made of wood in the Kamakura period. It is the only known ancient example of a statue of Gigeiten in Japan. There is also a theory that the body is the work of Unkei.
- Wooden statue of standing Taishaku-ten (木造帝釈天立像), Nara period (head) / Kamakura period (body). The head is made using the dry lacquer technique from the Nara period, and the body is made of wood from the Kamakura period.
- Wooden statue of standing Bon-ten (木造梵天立像), Nara period (head) / Kamakura period (body). The head is made using the dry lacquer technique from the Nara period, and the body is made of wood from the Kamakura period. Currently on loan to the Nara National Museum.
- Wooden statue of standing Kudatsu Bosatsu (木造伝・救脱菩薩立像),Nara period (head) / Kamakura period (body). The head is made using the dry lacquer technique from the Nara period, and the body is made of wood from the Kamakura period. Currently on loan to the Nara National Museum.
- Wooden statue of standing Jizō Bosatsu (木造地蔵菩薩立像), Heian period.
- Wooden statue of standing Jizō Bosatsu (木造地蔵菩薩立像), Heian period. Currently on loan to the Kyoto National Museum
- Wooden statue of standing Jūichmen Kannon (木造十一面観音立像), Heian period. Currently on loan to the Tokyo National Museum.
- Fragments of a Dry Lacquer Statue (脱活乾漆像残欠), Nara period. (8 dry lacquer fragments, 2 core pieces). Discovered in 1936 during repairs to the Taishakuten statue, the fragments are made of five to six layers of hemp cloth, on which wood pulp lacquer is piled up to a thickness of about one centimeter, molded, and then painted. The patterns on the sash and robes in the largest fragment incorporate cut gold leaf and ungen coloring. The larger piece of the core is almost complete, although it is missing its head, and together with the dry lacquer fragments, it is an indispensable resource for understanding the dry lacquer technique of the time. Currently on loan to the Nara National Museum.
- Wooden statue of standing Daigensui Myōō (木造大元帥明王立像), Kamakura period. Enshrined in the Daigen-dō on the west side of the main hall, it is a rare example of a Daigensui Myōō sculpture. A wrathful figure with six arms and snakes coiled all over its body, it dates from the time when Akishino-dera was a Shingon temple. It is a hidden image, unveiled only during the Goma ritual on May 5 and the Ketsuen Kaibi (opening of the temple doors) on June 6, but public viewing is only possible on June 6.

=== Nara Prefecture Designated Tangible Cultural Property ===
- Waniguchi gong (鰐口) Kamakura period (1301) -

=== Nara City Designated Tangible Cultural Property ===
- Painted Silk Scroll of Aizen Myōō (絹本著色愛染明王像), Nanboku-chō period Currently on loan to the Nara National Museum
- Painted Silk Scroll of Daigensui Myōō (絹本著色愛染明王像), Nanboku-chō period.

=== Nara City designated tangible folk cultural property ===
- Horse Votive Tablet fragment (馬図絵馬), Muromachi period, 7 pcs.

== See also ==
- List of National Treasures of Japan (temples)
