= Gigeiten =

Minor Japanese Buddhist goddess of the arts

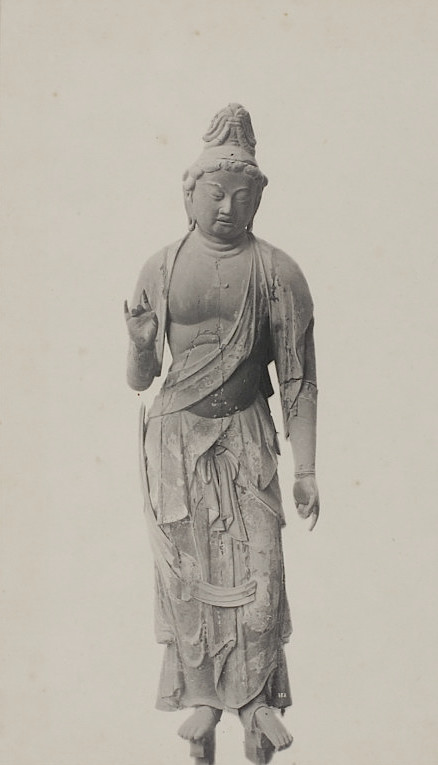
The statue of Gigeiten, Akishinodera

Gigeiten (Japanese: 伎芸天) is a minor goddess (deva, ten-nyo) associated with the arts in Japanese Buddhism. In addition to the arts, she is also believed to govern fortune and talent.

Gigeiten is also known by several other names, including Gigei Tennyo (ぎげいてんにょ), Daijizaitennyo (大自在天女), and Makeishura Chōshō Tennyo (摩醯首羅頂生天女, lit. "heavenly maiden born from the crown of Maheshvara"). The latter two names are patronymic in origin, as she is said to have been born from the hair of the deity Daijizaiten (Maheshvara in Sanskrit) while he was playing a musical instrument.

Her original Sanskrit name is unknown. Among the various celestial maidens (tennyo), Gigeiten is said to be the most skilled in music.

== Iconography ==
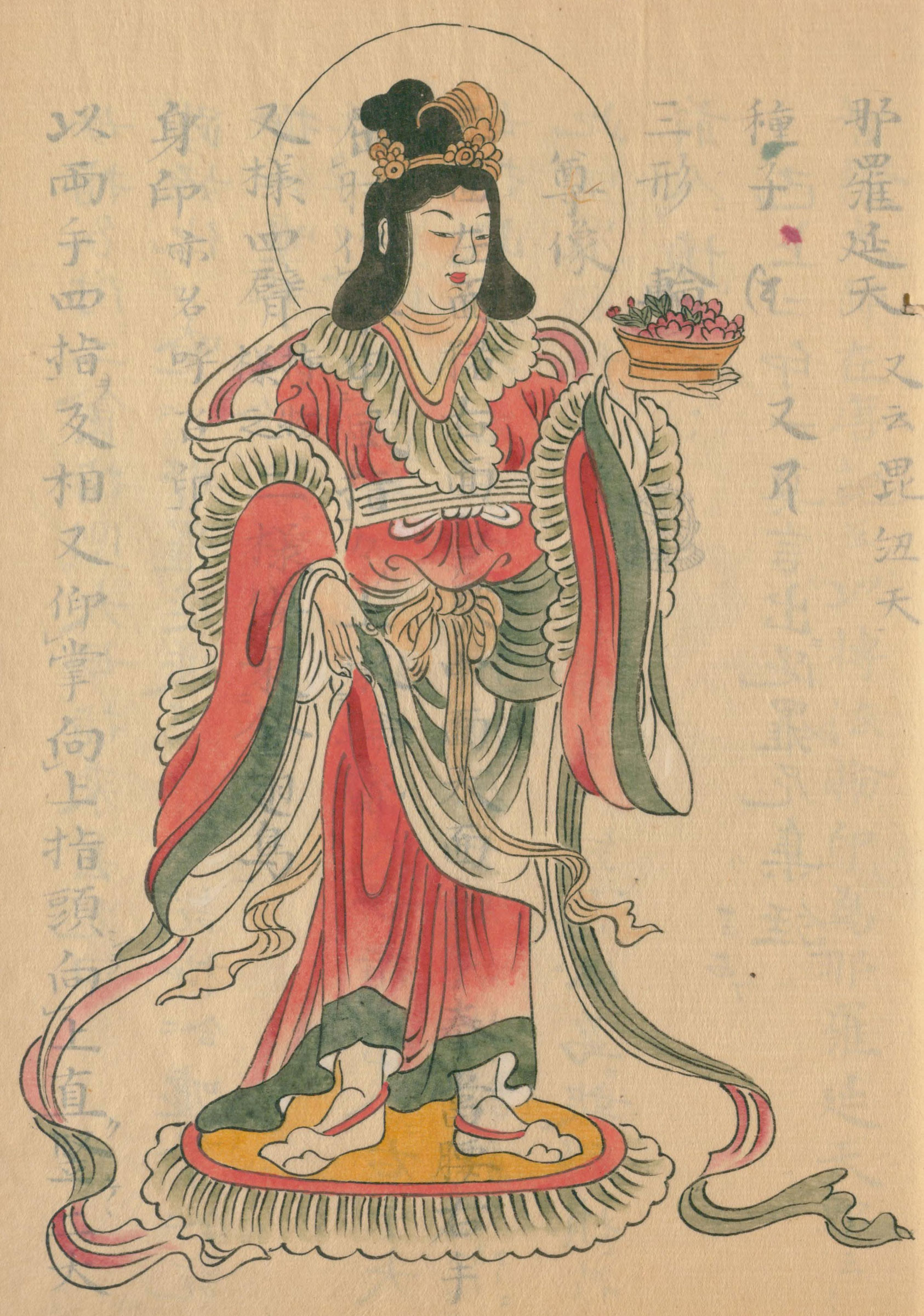
A traditional painting of Gigeiten

Gigeiten is depicted as a beautiful young goddess, dressed in white garments, a yoraku garland and bracelets. She holds celestial flowers or a basket of flowers in her raised left hand around her chest, while her right hand fingers the hem of her kimono waist robes.

Gigeiten's famous statue is located in Akishinodera temple. The statue is listed as "Wooden standing statue of Gigeiten (head made of dry lacquer)" in the Important Cultural Properties of Japan. A Nara era (8th century) dry lacquer head is fitted to the wooden carved body from the Kamakura period (13th century). Gigeiten is depicted as a bodhisattva (bosatsu), with the right hand raised and her left hand clinging her garments. Some scholars have questioned the identification of the statue as Gigeiten.

Another notable sculpture of the goddess was made by Takeuchi Kyuichi for the World's Columbian Exposition of 1893 and is now preserved at Tokyo University of the Arts.

== Worship ==
Gigeiten is regarded as a minor goddess. In esoteric Buddhism, the ritual of Gigei Tennyo-hō is said to grant her favour as mastery in the arts and good fortune; the ritual is prescribed to be performed only if the Shoten-ku in honour of Kangiten has failed to produce the desired benefits. Her seed syllable is हुं (huṃ). Her Samaya symbol is a celestial flower or a jewel. Her mudra involves intertwining the ring and middle fingers with hands together; other fingers are curved like a jewel. Her mantra is: "nǎng mó Ma xī shī mó Ra No wēn Sasō Ma mào shì qū No yì xī xì suō mó Ga".
