= Āṭānāṭiya Sutta =

32nd Sutta in the Digha Nikaya, Pāli Canon

- Type: Canonical Text
- Parent: Digha Nikaya
- Abbreviation: DN 32

The Āṭānāṭiya Sutta ("Discourse on the Heavenly Town of Āṭānāṭa") is the 32nd Sutta in the Dīgha Nikāya ("Long Discourses of Buddha") of the Pāli Canon.

It is a poem of spiritual protection against evil spirits and was presented to the Buddha by one of the "Four Great Heavenly Kings", King Vessavana (Pali; Sanskrit: Vaiśravana). It also contains a description of the celestial kingdoms of the Four Heavenly Kings. Parallels to this Pali discourse are extant in the Chinese Buddhist canon as T 1245 and in the Kangyur of the Tibetan Buddhist canon as a Mahāsūtra. The latter has been edited by Skilling, who also provides a detailed survey of additional parallel versions extant in Sanskrit and Uigur manuscripts.

== Introduction ==
The Āṭānāṭiya Sutta instructs on how to protect oneself and the monastic community from malevolent spirits, demons, and evil forces that disrupt the practice of the Buddha’s teachings. It describes the circumstances in which such beings may interfere with the holy relics and the followers of the Buddha, and offers protective verses recited for spiritual safeguarding.

During the Buddha’s time, malevolent beings (sometimes called "evil spirits" or malicious devas) who did not respect the Buddha or his disciples would harass and obstruct monks, nuns, and lay devotees. The Āṭānāṭiya Sutta was recited to protect the community, especially through the recitation of dhāraṇīs (protective spells), and included instruction on the powers and duties of the Four Heavenly Kings in maintaining cosmic order.

== Background ==
According to traditional accounts, the Four Great Heavenly Kings gathered in the celestial city of Āṭānāṭa to compose the sutta. They praised the Buddha and the Seven Buddhas who preceded him, and established the protective verses to counteract evil spirits. After composing the text, celestial armies accompanied the sutta to the earthly realm for the Buddha and his disciples.

The sutta describes the duties of celestial beings and the protective measures the monastic community can take, emphasizing adherence to moral precepts and avoidance of harmful actions, such as killing, theft, sexual misconduct, lying, and intoxicants. It also lists the names of 41 supernatural warriors and describes the powers of malevolent beings that can disrupt spiritual practice.

== List of yakkhas ==
The 41 yakkhas that appear in the text are:

- Inda
- Soma
- Varuṇa
- Bhāradvāja
- Pajāpati
- Candana
- Kāmaseṭṭha
- Kinnughaṇḍu
- Nighaṇḍu
- Panāda
- Opamañña
- Mātali
- Cittasena
- Gandhabba
- Naḷa
- Janesabha
- Sātāgira
- Hemavata
- Puṇṇaka
- Karatiya
- Guḷa
- Sivaka
- Mucalinda
- Vessāmitta
- Yugandhara
- Gopāla
- Suppagedha
- Suppagedha (or Supparodha)
- Hiri
- Netti
- Mandiya
- Pañcālacaṇḍa
- Āḷavaka
- Pajjunna
- Sumana
- Sumukha
- Dadhimukha
- Maṇi
- Māṇivara
- Dīgha
- Serīsaka

The text also includes 10 yakkhas who serve as informants to King Vessavana:

- Tatolā
- Tattalā
- Tatotalā
- Ojasi
- Tejasi
- Tatojasī
- Sūra
- Rājā
- Ariṭṭha
- Nemi

== See also ==
- Dīgha Nikāya
- Four Heavenly Kings
- Dhāraṇī
