= Rakusu =

Miniature version of a standard kāṣāya worn around the neck like a bib

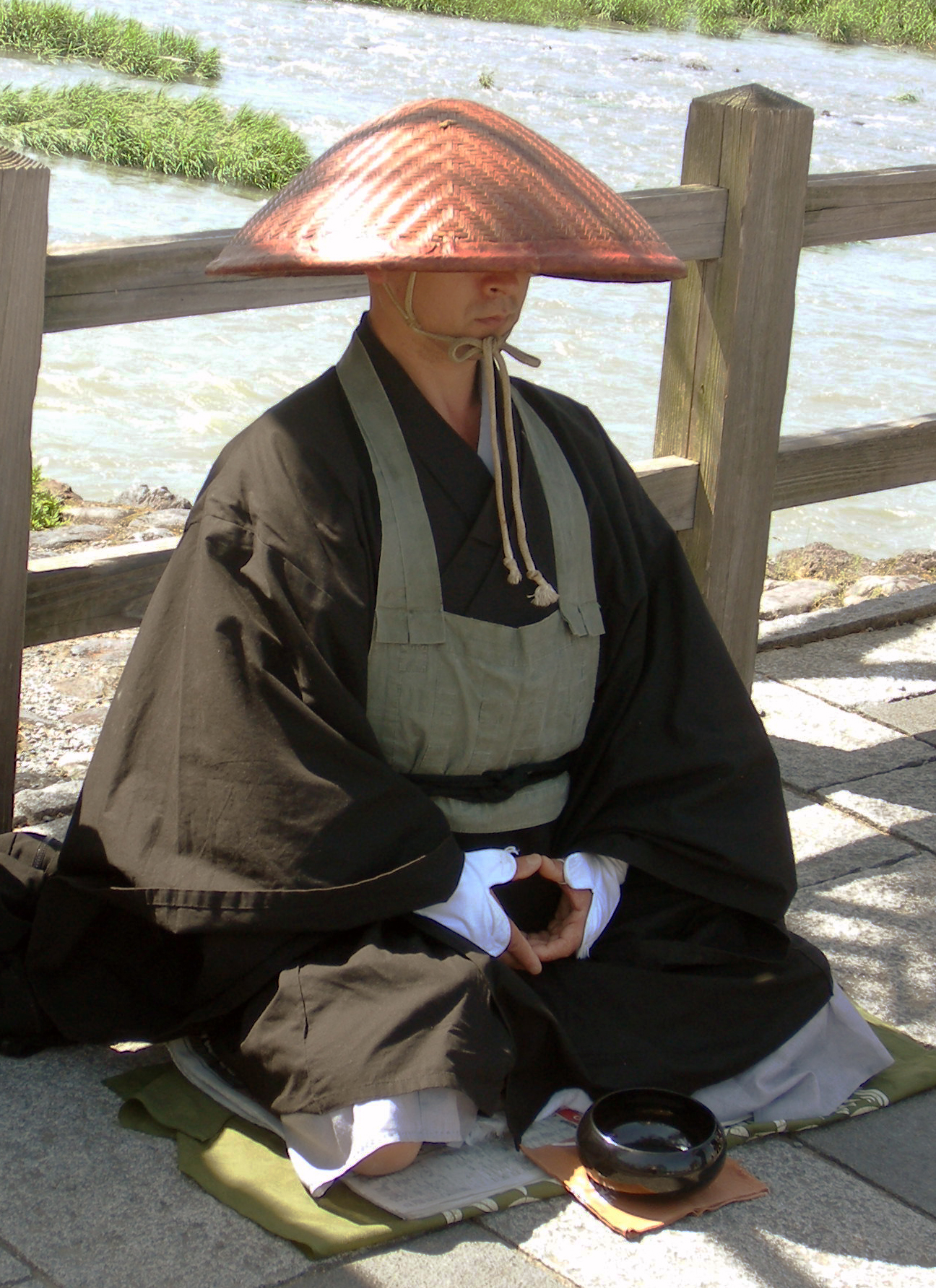
A Sōtō monk wearing his light-brown rakusu over his robes.

A rakusu (絡子) is a traditionally Japanese garment worn around the neck of Zen Buddhists who have taken the precepts. It can also signify Lay Ordination. It is made of 16 or more strips of cloth, sewn together into a brick-like pattern by the student during their period of preparation for their jukai or ordination ceremony.

There is no set standard, but the most common application of rakusu color is for the front of the rakusu to be black for priests and brown for teachers and sangha leaders. Occasionally in Western sanghas, the color green is used to signify that the wearer has been given Lay Entrustment, an authorization to teach at a basic level. The back of the rakusu is left white. The teacher will traditionally write the student's new Dharma name and occasionally their lineage.

== History ==
The rakusu is a miniature version of a standard kāṣāya worn around the neck like a bib. The rakusu is a garment possibly of Chinese origins, potentially dating back to periods of Buddhist persecutions.

The Buddha's original outer robe was a rectangular robe in the ratio of 6 by 9. The Buddha is said to have renounced the wearing of new cloth and created his robe from pieces of cast-off white burial cloth found at burial sites and dyed with saffron, for its disinfecting value. It is said in legend to resemble the rice fields seen by the Buddha himself while walking on pilgrimage.

One origin story holds that when the Chinese emperors forbade the wearing of robes, defrocked all the Buddhist monks, and bestowed imperial favor on the Confucian and Taoist priests, then Buddhist monks created a miniature version of their robe to be worn secretly around the neck underneath their regular lay clothing. Another suggests that the rakusu developed as Zen monks became involved in manual labor because a full robe would have been too unwieldy. Additionally, some Japanese scholars believe it was developed in Japan during the Edo or Tokugawa Era, as the result of regulations specifying the size and fabric type of monks clothing.

Assuming the rakusu was used in China, it fell into general disuse there, but the tradition continues in Japan and it is now commonly associated with Zen Buddhist lineages stemming from that country. The rakusu today is still sometimes made with an ornamental circular clasp on the left side to emulate the circular clasp used on some full-sized robes.

== Symbolism ==
The rakusu represents the garments that the Buddha put together to wear after he left his palace to seek enlightenment. According to Buddhist scripture, Siddhārtha left the palace where he was a prince, and collected rags from trash heaps, funeral pyres, and various other places. He then cleaned the rags by rubbing them in saffron, which gave his robes an orange-golden appearance.

In the Sōtō school, the rakusu's color is usually determined by the wearer's status. For example, lay practitioners frequently receive a blue rakusu and black ones are given upon ordination as a priest. A brown rakusu indicates that the wearer has received dharma transmission and is authorized to teach and lead an independent sangha. A green rakusu is sometimes used when the wearer has received Lay Entrustment and is authorized to teach basic dharma and practice.

On the back of the collar of the rakusu there is an identifying embroidered stitch that represents each of the existing schools of Zen. The Sōtō school uses a broken pine needle design, the Rinzai school a mountain-shaped triangle, and the Ōbaku school a six-pointed star.
