= Dabba Mallaputta =

Dabba Mallaputta (Pāli; Sanskrit: Dravya Mallaputra) was a disciple of Gautama Buddha, distinguished by his youth and his service to the Sangha. At the age of seven he became an arahant and was accepted into the early Buddhist community as a monk. He died at an early age after demonstrating a variety of supernatural abilities.

== Biography ==
According to the Therigatha commentary, Dabba's mother died during his birth and he was found alive on her funeral pyre as an infant. His family lived in the state of the Mallakas (possibly in Kusinara). When the Buddha visited the Malla country, Dabba asked to be presented before him by his grandmother, and sought ordination. He was accepted into the order, and was said to have achieved the status of an arahant in the ordination hall.

Wanting to be of service, Dabba is depicted in the Vinaya Pitaka as having volunteered for a number of duties relating to distributing goods and living quarters to the assembly of monks. As a result, he was recognized among the Buddha's disciples as being foremost in service. Conflicts between Dabba and followers of the monks Mettiya and Bhummajakā resulted in episodes where Dabba was accused of misdeeds but later exonerated. Apadāna stories in canonical and commentarial literature attributed these occurrences to Dabba having slandered an arahant in a previous life.

The Udāna describes Dabba's death. After returning from an alms round near Rājagaha, he announced his impending parinibbana to the Buddha and displayed a number of supernatural powers, culminating with his rising into the air and bursting into flames.

Dabba's name is written 陀羅婆摩羅 (pinyin: Tuóluópómóluó) in the Chinese Buddhist canon. An individual known as Culla Dravya Mallaputra is also recorded, but this is regarded as resulting from a corruption or misreading of the Sanskrit or Prakrit Agama text.
