= Velukandakiya =

Prominent lay disciple of the Buddha

Personal life
- Occupation: Upasika

Religious life
- Religion: Buddhism

Senior posting
- Teacher: Buddha

Velukandakiya was a lay female disciple of the Buddha. Velukandakiya is also known as Uttara and Nandamata (lit. 'mother of Nanda', not to be confused with the stepbrother of Buddha with the same name).

She is praised as the standard-bearer lay female disciple in Samyutta Nikaya 17.24, Only daughter.

"Dear, you should become like Khujjuttara the lay follower and Velukandakiya Nanda's mother – for this is the standard and criterion for my female disciples who are lay followers, that is Khujjuttara the lay follower and Velukandakiya, Nanda's mother."

The other important female disciple was Khujjuttara.
