= Hatthaka of Alavi =

Prominent lay disciple of the Buddha

Hastaka Āṭavika (Sanskrit); Hatthaka Ālavaka (Pali)

Personal life
- Born: Ālavī
- Parent: King Ālavaka (Father)
- Occupation: Upāsaka

Religious life
- Religion: Buddhism

Senior posting
- Teacher: Buddha

Translations of Hastaka Āṭavaka
- Sanskrit: Hastaka Āṭavaka
- Pali: Hatthaka Āḷavaka
- Chinese: 曠野手; 手阿羅婆長者; 呵侈阿羅婆 (Pinyin: Kuàngyěshǒu; Shǒu'āluópó Chángzhě; Hēchǐ'āluópó)
- Japanese: 曠野手(こうやしゅ); 手阿羅婆長者(てあらばちょうしゃ); 呵侈阿羅婆(かしあらば) (Rōmaji: Kōyashu; Tearaba-chōsha; Kashiaraba)
- Korean: 광야수; 수아라바; 가치아라바 (RR: Gwangyasu; Suaraba; Gachiaraba)
- Thai: หัตถกอุบาสก (RTGS: Hatthako Ubasok)

Hastaka Āṭavaka (Sanskrit; Pali: Hatthaka Ālavaka), also known as Hastaka of Āṭavī (Sanskrit; Pali: Hatthaka of Ālavī), was one of the chief lay male disciples of the Buddha, along with Citta. He was enlightened as an Anāgāmi or Non-Returner. Hastaka is considered the lay disciple of the Buddha who was foremost in gathering a following using the "four bases of sympathy" and was known for his ability to bring others to Buddhism.

== Etymology ==
The name Hastaka comes from the Sanskrit word hasta meaning "hand." This refers to the disciple being handed over to the Buddha by the yakṣa Āṭavaka and then by the Buddha to the king's messengers.

== Person ==
According to the Pali Commentary (SA.iii.223), Hastaka was one of seven laymen who was always accompanied by five hundred lay disciples. He is mentioned in the Buddhavamsa xxvi.19 along with Citta as a chief layman and considered the foremost in gathering a following using the "four bases of sympathy" which are described as being:

1) giving gifts
2) speaking with kindly words
3) doing kindly deeds
4) treating people with equality

The Buddha praised him for possessing an additional eight qualities:

1) faith
2) virtue
3) conscientiousness
4) fear of blame
5) ability to listen well
6) charity
7) wisdom
8) modesty

== Death and attainments ==
Hastaka finally achieved the state of an Anāgāmi and was reborn in the Avṛha heaven in the Pure Abodes. As a deity, he once tried to visit the Buddha, but collapsed and was unable to stand upright. The Buddha recommended that he assume a more gross physical form, after which he was able to regain his composure.

Hastaka informed the Buddha that in this world, he was constantly surrounded by devas who wished to learn the Dharma from him. He also stated that he had died with three regrets:

1) not having seen enough of the Buddha
2) not having heard enough of the Dharma
3) not having served enough to the Sangha

== Past lives ==
The Chinese version of the Vinayavibhaṅga (T1442) relates a Jataka story of one of Hastaka's past lives.

There were once two brothers who lived in the forest. The elder brother was named Hastapādajālin (手足網鞔, pinyin: Shǒuzúwǎngmán; Tibetan: rKang lag dra ba can) and the younger brother was named Nirhastapādajālin (無網鞔, pinyin: Wúwǎngmán; rKang lag dra bas ma 'brel ba; or simply Jālika). The elder was an ascetic while the younger practiced under a teacher.

On one occasion, one of the daughters of the teacher expressed interest in marrying Nirhastapādajālin. He refused and she became infuriated. Due to her ability to stretch her arm far distances and that she shared an abode with demons, the brother decided to flee. She pursued him and in her rage, attempted to kill him with her sword. At the last moment, Nirhastapādajālin cried out in devotion to his elder brother Hastapādajālin, who swept him away to his hermitage. There he became an ascetic and developed the five supernormal powers like his brother.

The text clarifies that Hastapādajālin was the Buddha, Nirhastapādajālin was Hastaka Āṭavaka and the woman was Queen Śyāmavatī.

== See also ==
- Anāgāmi (non-returner)
- Arahant
- Householder (Buddhism)
- Sāvaka (Buddha's disciples)
- Pure Abodes
