= Sīvali =

Prominent disciple of the Buddha known for his great fortune

Sivali Thera
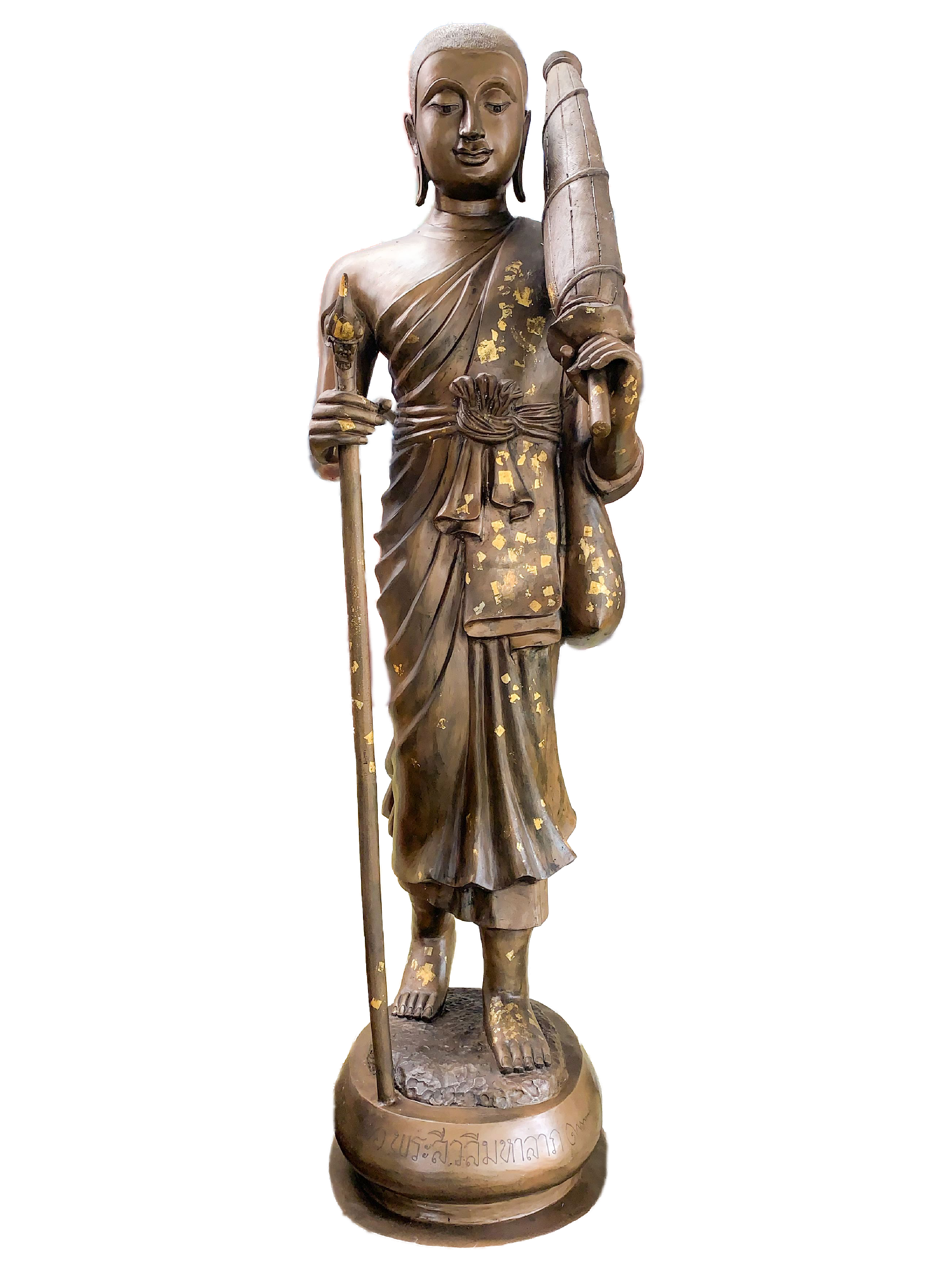
- Statue of Phra Sivali at Wat Ratchasingkhon, Bangkok

Personal life
- Born: Siwali Kumar (Prince Siwali) Koliya
- Parents: Mahali (father); Queen Suppavasa (mother)
- Known for: Disciple of the Buddha renowned for wealth and merit

Religious life
- Religion: Buddhism
- School: Theravāda
- Dharma names: Sivali Thera

Senior posting
- Teacher: Sariputta

Sivali Thera (Pali: Sīvali; Burmese: ရှင်သီဝလိ pronounced [ʃɪ̀n θìwəli]; Thai: พระสีวลี RTGS: phra siwali; Sinhala: සීවලී; Chinese: 屍婆羅) was a revered Arahant and is widely venerated in Theravada Buddhism. He is counted among the 80 great disciples of the Buddha and praised as the foremost disciple in receiving offerings (Etadagga).

== Early life ==
Sivali was born to Prince Mahali and Queen Suppavasa of the Koliya clan. According to legend, Queen Suppavasa endured a prolonged pregnancy of seven years, seven months, and seven days. Greatly distressed, she longed to see the Buddha. Her husband prayed to the Blessed One, who responded, "Princess Suppavasa, may you be happy. May you be free from disease and suffering. May you give birth to a son who is free from disease." Immediately afterward, Queen Suppavasa gave birth painlessly to a healthy son. Upon birth, the child—named Sivali Kumara was physically developed like a seven-year-old and could immediately speak.

== Ordination and Enlightenment ==
The day after his birth, the Buddha and 500 monks visited the palace to receive alms. After the meal, the Buddha asked Venerable Sariputta to deliver a sermon on the suffering of birth. Inspired, Sivali requested to be ordained, and with his parents’ consent, he was ordained under Sariputta. During the head-shaving ceremony, Venerable Moggallana taught him the Thirty-Two Meditations. Sivali diligently applied himself and attained arahantship, becoming fully liberated from defilements.

From that day on, Sivali never lacked the four requisites—robes, food, lodging, and medicine—as his past merit attracted abundant offerings. At the age of twenty, he received full ordination as a monk.

== Past Lives and Merit ==
According to commentarial sources, during the era of Padumuttara Buddha, Sivali—then a layman—heard the Buddha praise a monk named Sudassana as the foremost in receiving alms. Aspiring for the same distinction, he invited 500 monks for almsgiving over seven days and offered them robes, making a wish to attain the same distinction in a future life.

Over 91 kalpas, he was reborn repeatedly in heavenly and human realms. During the time of Vipassi Buddha, he was a poor villager near Bandhumati. One day, he brought milk and a large honeycomb to the city but instead offered both to the Buddha, renewing his aspiration to be reborn as a monk endowed with abundant requisites.

In another life, he was reborn as the son of King Brahmadatta of Varanasi. After his father’s assassination and the seizure of the kingdom, he fled. On returning, he laid siege to the city for seven years and seven days—interpreted as karmic retribution for his mother’s prolonged pregnancy—and eventually reclaimed the throne.

== Role in the Sangha ==
Phra Sivali was one of the Buddha’s forty right-hand disciples. He was renowned for attracting abundant offerings wherever he went. On one occasion, the Buddha and 500 monks planned to travel through a remote forest. Ananda expressed concern about obtaining alms in the wilderness. The Buddha replied, “Is not Sivali among us? Then do not worry.” Indeed, devas and forest dwellers offered abundant alms throughout the journey. The monks lived in comfort for a month, entirely supported by the merit of Sivali.

Amazed, the monks praised Sivali’s beneficent power. The Buddha then declared:

"Etadaggaṃ bhikkhave mama sāvakānaṃ lābhīnaṃ yadidaṃ Sīvali."
"Among my disciples who receive offerings, Sivali is the foremost."

== Depiction and Veneration ==
Sivali is often depicted standing with a walking staff, alms bowl, and prayer beads. He is especially revered in Thailand, Myanmar, Sri Lanka, and other Theravada countries as the patron of travelers and a bringer of prosperity. Worshippers pray to him for success in business, safe journeys, and protection from misfortunes such as fire or theft.

== End of Life ==
The Buddhist scriptures do not specify where or when Phra Sivali died. However, tradition holds that he lived a long and meritorious life, ultimately attaining final nibbāna (parinibbāna).

== Legacy ==
Phra Sivali remains a symbol of abundance, generosity, and good fortune. Shrines to him can be found across Southeast Asia, especially in forest monasteries and travel stations. His image is commonly carried by travelers and merchants seeking protection and blessings.

== See also ==
- Arahant
- Upagupta
- Shin Upagutta
- Ari Buddhism
