= Citta (disciple) =

Prominent lay disciple of the Buddha

Personal life
- Occupation: Upasaka

Religious life
- Religion: Buddhism

Senior posting
- Teacher: Buddha

Upāsaka Citta (Sanskrit: Citra) was one of the chief male lay disciples of the Buddha, along with Hatthaka of Alavi. He is considered the lay disciple of the Buddha who was foremost in teaching the Dharma. He was a wealthy merchant from Savatthi. It is said his life and character were so pure that near his death, if he had wished to be a Chakravarti, or universal monarch, it would've been granted. However, he turned down this wish as it was temporal. He had become an Anāgāmi or Non-Returner.

In an Early Buddhist Text (SN IV.297-300), Citta is asked by Jain leader Nigantha Nataputta (Mahavira) if he believes the Buddha who says that there is a concentration free from deliberation and thought. He initially gives an ambiguous answer, but then turns out not to believe, but to know these things from his own experience obtained while practicing the jhanas.

== Lay Dhamma Teacher ==
The Buddha considered Upāsaka Citta to be the most learned and lucid of all the lay Dhamma teachers. After becoming the Buddha's lay disciple, he shared and explained the Buddha's teaching to the other citizens of the town, and converted five hundred of them, and on one occasion took all of the new converts to Savatthi to visit the Buddha. The discourses in the Tipitaka preached to and by Citta indicate his profound grasp of the most subtle aspects of the Buddha Dhamma and indeed later he became enlightened as an Anāgāmi or Non-Returner.

== Model for Lay Disciples ==
In the Early Buddhist Texts (SN 17:23), the Buddha said that a devoted lay disciple should foster the wish to become like Citta and Hatthaka, while devoted bhikkhus should aspire to equal Sāriputta and Mahāmoggallāna. They are the model standards are set for lay people and monks. Of the ten instructive discourses contained in the Citta Saṃyutta, three of the discourses deal with the questions posed by Citta to the bhikkhus, three of them are queries put to Citta by the bhikkhus, and four refer to personal events.
