= Bhadda Kapilani =

Personal life
- Born: 6th century BCE Sagala (Present day Sialkot, Punjab, Pakistan)
- Occupation: Bhikkhuni

Religious life
- Religion: Buddhism

Senior posting
- Teacher: Gautama Buddha

Bhadda Kapilani was a Buddhist bhikkhuni and a leading disciple of Gautama Buddha. Among the bhikkhunis she was regarded as the foremost in analysing the previous reincarnations of beings and their previous karma, as described in the Jataka of the Pali Canon. Before they both entered the sangha, she was the wife of Mahakassapa, the arahant who led the sangha after the paranibbana of the Buddha and his two chief disciples Sariputta and Mahamoggallana.

== Early years ==
Pipphali Kassapa, as he was born, was adamant that he would not marry, but would become an ascetic. At the continued behest of his parents, he finally agreed to marry in order to please them, on the condition that a girl who conformed to his standards could be found. His parents thus hired eight brahmins to go and find such a girl. At Sagala they found Bhadda Kapilani, the wealthy daughter of a brahmin, who was aged sixteen and four years younger than Pipphali Kassapa. Her parents agreed to the marriage proposal, but Bhadda Kapilani did not wish to marry, as she also wished for a religious life as a female ascetic.

Pipphali, believing that the brahmins would not be successful, was unhappy with the brahmins' success and sent a letter to the Bhadda Kapilani stating, "Bhadda, please marry someone else of equal status and live a happy home life with him. As for myself, I shall become an ascetic. Please do not have regrets." Bhadda Kapilani independently sent him a similar letter, but both sets of parents, suspecting such an attempt to scupper the marriage would occur, arranged for both letters to be intercepted and replaced by letters of welcome. As a result Bhadda was taken to Magadha and the young couple were married. In accordance with their ascetic aspirations, they agreed to a life of celibacy. In accordance with this, they laid a garland of flowers between them before they went to bed, determined not to yield to sensual desire.

This young wealthy couple lived comfortably and happily for many years. As long as Pipphali's parents lived, they did not even have to look after the estate's farms. But when his parents died, they were entrusted with the large property. One day when Pipphali was inspecting the fields, he saw in shocking clarity what he had not seen before. He observed that many birds gathered and picked the worms from the furrows when the soil was plowed. This sight, common to a farmer, startled him. He realised that his wealth, generated by the produce of his fields, was created with the suffering of other living beings. He asked one of his laborers: "Who will have to bear the consequences of such an action?" to which the laborer replied, "You yourself, sir." Worried by the insight into karmic retribution, he went home and reflected: "If I have to carry along the burden of guilt for that killing, what use is all that wealth to me? It will be better if I give it all to Bhadda and go forth into the ascetic's life."

However at the same time, Bhadda had a similar experience. She noticed that when sesame seeds were left in the open to dry, various birds ate the insects that had been attracted by the seeds. When she asked her servants who was morally responsible for the violent death of so many creatures, she was told that it was hers. Bhadda thought: "If even by that much I commit a wrong, I won't be able to lift my head above the ocean of rebirths, even in a thousand lives. As soon as Pipphali returns, I shall hand over everything to him and leave to take up the ascetic life."

== Renouncement ==
When both found each other in agreement, Bhadda and Pipphali bought pale yellow cloth and clay bowls from the bazaar, and then shaved each other's heads. They freed their servants and continued on their way. While walking, Pipphali went ahead while Bhadda followed behind him. Worried that observers would believe that they were attached to each other, they parted in their religious search.

Bhadda journeyed to Savatthi where she attended to the discourses of Gautama Buddha at the Jetavana monastery. As the order of nuns (Bhikkhuni sangha) did not exist at the time, she practiced at a nunnery of non-Buddhist female ascetics nearby. She lived there for five years until she could obtain ordination as a bhikkhuni. Soon afterwards, she was able to attain arahanthood.

As an arahant bhikkhuni, Bhadda spent most of her time in the education of the younger nuns and instructing them in monastic discipline (Vinaya). The Buddha praised Bhadda as being the foremost among the nuns who could recollect past lives.

== Jataka ==
The Jataka documents many accounts of the past reincarnations of the Bhadda Kapilani. In many of these, she is related to Kasyapa.

At the time of the former Vipassī Buddha, they were a poor brahmin couple, to the extent that they had only one single upper garment, so that only one of them could leave the hut at a given time. In this story, the brahmin was called "he with one garment" (ekasataka). In their life as that poor brahmin couple, both had listened to the sermons of the Vipassī Buddha. Through listening to that Buddha's teaching, the brahmin wanted to offer his only garment to the sangha. But after he had so resolved, he pondered that as it was his and his wife's only garment, he thought that he should consult her. However he went ahead and offered the garment to the monks. Having done so, he clapped his hands and joyfully shouted "I have vanquished! I have vanquished!". When the king, who had listened to the sermon behind a curtain, heard what had occurred, he sent sets of garments to the brahmin and made him the court chaplain, ending the couple's poverty.

Bhadda was once the mother of a brahmin youth who was a pupil of the future Gautama Buddha and wanted to become an ascetic. Kasyapa was her husband and Ananda was their son. Bhadda wanted her son to know the worldly life before being allowed to become an ascetic. This came to young brahman drastically when his teacher's mother fell in love with him and contemplated killing her son. This encounter with passion gave him a deep revulsion for worldly life, and earned his parents gave him permission to go forth as an ascetic.

Another time Kasyapa and Bhadda had been the brahmin parents of four sons who in the future were to be Gautama Buddha, Anuruddha, Sariputra and Mahamoggallana. All four had wanted to become ascetics and despite early resistance from their parents were allowed to so.

In one previous life Bhadda was the wife of a landowner. One day, having argued with her sister-in-law, she begrudged her the merit of offering alms to a Pratyekabuddha. She took the Pratyekabuddha's bowl, filling it with mud. She felt remorse, took the bowl back, washed it, filled it with delicious and fragrant food and offered it to the Pratyekabuddha. As a result, in her next life she was wealthy, but her body was odorous. Her husband, later to be Kasyapa, could not bear this and left her. In preparation of disposing of her property, she had her ornaments melted down and formed into a golden brick and went to monastery and donated it to the construction of a stupa in honor of the recently deceased Kassapa Buddha. After she had done that, her body became fragrant again, and Kasyapa took her back.

Two lives before her final existence, Bhadda was queen of Varanasi and used to support several Pratyekabuddhas. Deeply moved by their sudden death, she left the royal life and lived a one of meditation in the Himalayas. She was reborn in a Brahma-world, as was Kasyapa. After the end of the long life-span they were reborn as Pipphali Kassapa and Bhadda Kapilani.

== Sources ==
- Hecker, Hellmuth (1987). "Maha Kassapa:Father of the Sangha". Buddhist Publication Society.
- Karunaratne, Indumatie (1965), "Bhaddā-Kapilānī", in Malalasekera, G. P.; Weeraratne, W. G. (eds.), Encyclopaedia of Buddhism, vol. I I, Government of Sri Lanka, ASIN B0045VB37O
- Thera, Nyanaponika; Hecker, Hellmuth (1997), Bodhi, Bhikkhu (ed.), Great Disciples of the Buddha: Their Lives, Their Works, Their Legacy, Wisdom Pubns, ISBN 0861711289
