= Ālavī =

Ancient kingdom of northern-central India

Ālavī (Pāli: Ālavī) or Āṭavī (Sanskrit: Āṭavī) was an ancient kingdom of central South Asia whose existence is attested during the Iron Age. The inhabitants of Ālavī were of non-Indo-Aryan origin.

== Location ==
Ālavī was a small state located near the Gaṅgā river. Alexander Cunningham and Vincent Arthur Smith identified Ālavī with the Ġāzīpur region.

The name of the state was derived from that of its capital, named Ālabhiyā, or Ālavī (in Pāli) or Āṭavī (in Sanskrit), which lied on the road between Kosala's capital of Sāvatthī and Magadha's capital of Rājagaha, and was located thirty yojana from Sāvatthī and twelve yojana from Varanasi.

== History ==
The 24th Jain Tīrthaṅkara, Mahāvīra, visited Ālavī city, where he converted the Parivrājaka Pudgala to Śramaṇa Dharma in the Śaṅkhavana caitya. During Mahāvīra's time, Ālavī was inhabited by Ṛṣibhadraputra and the Śramaṇopāsakas.

The Buddha often visited Ālavī the Aggalāva cetiya which was located in its capital city.

The king of Ālabhiyā in the Buddha's time held the title of Jiyasattū, meaning "conqueror of enemies."

== See also ==
- Hatthaka of Alavi, disciple of The Buddha
