= Upāsaka =

Lay followers of Buddhism, not monks or nuns

Translations of Upāsaka
- English: lay devotee
- Sanskrit: उपासक (upāsaka)
- Pali: उपासक (upāsaka)
- Burmese: ဥပါသကာ / ဥပါသိကာ (MLCTS: ṵpàθakà / ṵpàθḭkà)
- Chinese: 優婆塞, 優婆夷 / 鄔波索迦, 鄔波斯迦 / 在家眾 / 居士 (Pinyin: yōupósāi / jushi)
- Japanese: 在家（ざいけ） / 優婆塞（うばそく） / 優婆夷（うばい） (Rōmaji: zaike / ubasoku / ubai)
- Khmer: ឧបាសក (masculine)/ឧបាសិកា (feminine) (UNGEGN: ŭbasâk (masculine)/ŭbasĕka (feminine))
- Korean: 우바새 / 우바이 (RR: ubasae / ubai)
- Mongolian: ᠤᠪᠠᠰᠢ/ᠤᠪᠠᠰᠢᠨᠵᠠ (ubaşi/ubasinja); ᠭᠡᠨᠡᠨ/ᠭᠡᠨᠡᠨᠮ᠎ᠠ᠋ (genen/genenma)
- Tibetan: དགེ་བསྙེན/དགེ་བསྙེན་མ (genyen/genyenma)
- Thai: อุบาสก / อุบาสิกา (RTGS: Ubasok / Ubasika)
- Vietnamese: Ưu-bà-tắc (Cận sự nam - Upāsaka) / Ưu-bà-di (Cận sự nữ - Upāsikā) / Cư sĩ

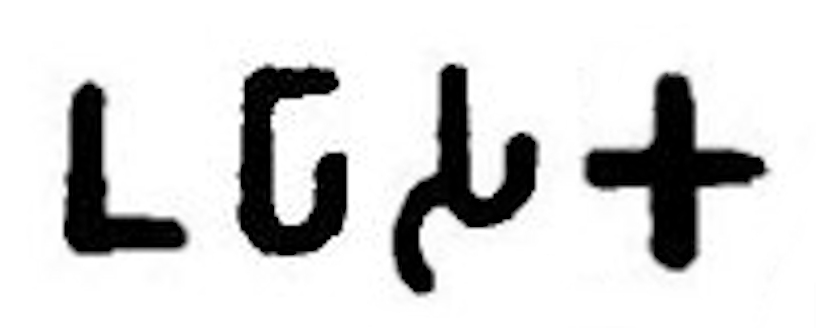
The word Upāsaka (Brahmi script), used by Ashoka in his Minor Rock Edict No.1 to describe his affiliation to Buddhism (circa 258 BCE).

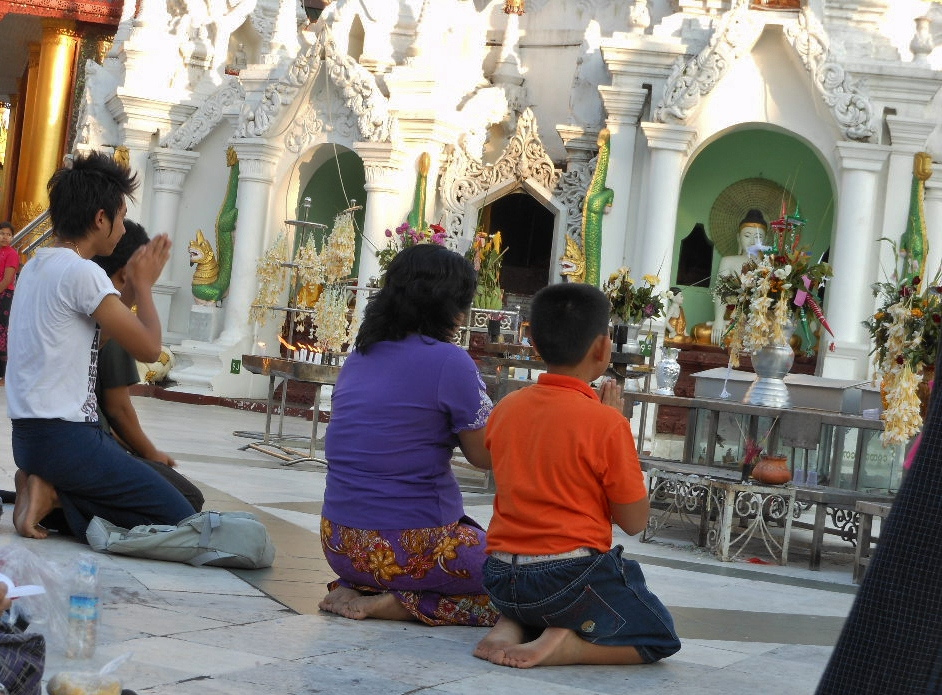
Upasakas praying in Yangon, Myanmar.

Upāsaka (masculine) or Upāsikā (feminine) are from the Sanskrit and Pāli words for "attendant". This is the title of followers of Buddhism (or, historically, of The Buddha) who are not monks, nuns, or novice monastics in a Buddhist order, and who undertake certain vows. In modern times they have a connotation of dedicated piety that is best suggested by terms such as "lay devotee" or "devout lay follower".

== From the Buddhist scriptures ==
In the Pali Canon's Jivaka Sutta, the Buddha is asked, "Lord, to what extent is one a lay follower (upāsako)?" The Buddha replies that one takes refuge in the Triple Gem. Asked how one is a "virtuous lay follower" (upāsako sīlavā), the Buddha replies that one undertakes the Five Precepts. Asked how one practices being a lay follower "both for his own benefit & the benefit of others," the Buddha states that one is consummate oneself in and encourages others in the consummation of: conviction (saddhā); virtue (sīla); generosity (cāga); visiting monks; and, hearing, remembering, analyzing, understanding and practicing the Dhamma.

== Precepts ==
The five vows to be held by upāsakas are referred to as the "Five Precepts" (Pāli: pañcasīla):

1. I will not take the life of a sentient being;
2. I will not take what has not been given to me;
3. I will refrain from sexual misconduct;
4. I will refrain from false speech;
5. I will refrain from becoming intoxicated.

In the Theravada tradition, on Uposatha days, devout lay practitioners may request the "Eight Precepts" from monastics (Pali: uposathaṃ samādiyati). It was a widespread practice in Chinese Buddhist communities as well, and is still practiced.

The eight precepts is a list of precepts that are observed by lay devotees on observance days and festivals. They include general precepts such as refraining from killing, but also more specific ones, such as abstaining from cosmetics. These precepts were probably based on pre-Buddhist sāmaṇa practices. Since the eight precepts are often upheld on the Buddhist uposatha days, they are called the uposatha vows or one-day precepts in such context. They are considered to support meditation practice, and are often observed when staying in monasteries and temples. In some periods and places, such as in 7th–10th-century China, the precepts were widely observed. In modern times, there have been revival movements and important political figures that have observed them continuously.

== Initiation ceremonies ==
=== Theravada traditions ===
In traditional Theravada communities, a non-Buddhist becomes a Buddhist lay disciple by repeating the ancient formulas for the Three Refuges and the Five Precepts in response to the formal administrations of a monk or by himself in himself or in front of a Cetiya or an image of the Buddha. Newborns of Buddhist parents are traditionally initiated by being brought on their first outing to a temple on a full-moon or festival day where they are presented to the Triple Gem.

=== Mahayana/Vajrayana traditions ===
In both the Chinese Chan and Japanese Zen traditions, a ceremony of taking refuge in the Triple Gem as well as the receiving of the precepts (受戒 Chinese: shoujie; Japanese: jukai) is a type of lay ordination.

The ordination procedures for receiving precepts in the Chinese tradition are laid out in the fourteenth chapter of the Sutra on Upasaka Precepts (優婆塞戒經受戒品第十四).

The disciple hoping to receive the precepts first pays respects to the six directions, which represent their parents, teacher, husband or wife, friends, religious master and employees (traditionally servants). Honoring the six directions is a "means fulfilling one's reciprocal responsibilities in each of these relationships".

A person who has honored these relationships and paid his respects to the six directions must then receive permission from his parents to accept the precepts. If they agree, he informs his spouse and those under his employment. Traditionally, the disciple would then get permission from his king. This last procedure is no longer widely observed.

The disciple, having paid his respects to the six directions and having the relevant permissions, may now ask a monastic to help him receive the precepts. (In modern times, these ceremonies are normally held on a regular basis at temples and presided over by the temple master or his deputy, and one would not ask a random monk or nun to perform the ceremony.)

The monastic and disciple then engage in a dialog, with the monastic asking questions and the disciple answering. The monastic asks the disciple if he has paid respects to the six directions and if he has the relevant permissions. The monk will ask a series of questions that ensure the practitioner has not committed grave offenses and is both physically and mentally fit to receive the precepts.

The monastic explains the benefits of the precepts as well as the negative consequences of breaking them, and asks if the disciple is prepared to accept them and remain dedicated to the Triple Gem. Next, the monastic asks the disciple to follow additional habits to prevent breaking the precepts, to discourage others from breaking them, and to avoid excessive attachment to the five skandhas. If the practitioner is prepared, the monk asks the disciple to practice all the advice for six months while remaining under the monk's regular observation.

If, after six months, the disciple has upheld the precepts well, he may ask the monastic for formal taking of the precepts. The disciple will then take refuge in the Triple Gem, and the monastic will then ensure the disciple is prepared to take on all (as opposed to only some) of the precepts. If the disciple commits to accepting all the precepts, and recites them with the monk, then he has finished his lay ordination.

The chapter closes with a description of consequences of breaking the precepts and the obligations that one must take on after receiving the precepts.

== Ceremonial dress ==
Traditionally, in India, upāsakas wore white robes, representing a level of renunciation between lay people and monastics. For this reason, some traditional texts make reference to "white-robed lay people" (avadāta-vassana). This practice can still be found in contemporary Theravadin temples, especially during the occasion when a non-Buddhist converts to Buddhism or when one is observing the Eight Precepts on an uposatha day.

In the Chinese tradition, both upāsakas and upāsikās are permitted to wear robes for temple ceremonies and retreats, as well as home practice. Upāsakas and upāsikās wear long sleeved black or brown robes called haiqing (海青), symbolic of their refuge in the Triple Jewel. A brown kasaya called a manyi (缦衣) worn outside the black robes is symbolic of their upholding of the precepts. Unlike monastics, they are not permitted to regularly wear robes outside functions other than temple activities or Buddhist disciplines.

Some Japanese laity can also be seen wearing a rakusu, a short cloth worn around the neck of Zen Buddhist laity. Another form is the wagesa, a short surplice in the form of a strip of brocade fabric worn around the neck, with the temple mon emblazoned on it. It also acts as a simplified type of kasaya.

== Famous lay followers ==
In the Early Buddhist Texts (SN 17:23), the Buddha said that a devoted lay disciple should foster the wish to become like Citta and Hatthaka, while devoted bhikkhus should aspire to equal Sāriputta and Mahāmoggallāna. They are the model standards are set for lay people and monks. Of the ten instructive discourses contained in the Citta Saṃyutta, three of the discourses deal with the questions posed by Citta to the bhikkhus, three of them are queries put to Citta by the bhikkhus, and four refer to personal events. Another famous male lay follower is Anathapindika. Regarding female disciples, the most important figures are Khujjuttarā (foremost in teaching Dharma) and Visakha (foremost in generosity).

In the Vajrayana tradition, a well known Upasaka is Upasaka Dharmatala who serves as the attendant of the 16 arhats. He is seen to be an emanation of Avalokitesvara.

== See also ==
- Three Refuges
- Five Precepts
- Eight Precepts
- Dhammika Sutta (Sn 2.14)
- Dighajanu Sutta (AN 8.54)
- Sigalovada Sutta (DN 31)
- Householder (Buddhism)
- Sravaka - Buddhist "disciple" (includes both monastic and lay followers)
- Anagarika- a title which describes a midway status between a monk and a layperson
- Ngagpa - non-monastic Tibetan Buddhism practitioners
- Upasana - Sanskrit for "worship" or "sitting near, attend to."

== Sources ==
- Bluck, Robert (2002). The Path of the Householder: Buddhist Lay Discipline in the Pali Canon, Buddhist Studies Review 19 (1), 1-18
- Buswell, Robert E. Jr.; Lopez, Donald S. Jr. (2013), Princeton Dictionary of Buddhism (PDF), Princeton University Press, ISBN 978-0-691-15786-3, archived (PDF) from the original on 12 June 2018
- Encyclopædia Britannica (2007). "Upasaka." Retrieved 2007-10-24 from "Encyclopædia Britannica Online" at https://web.archive.org/web/20060621163706/http://www.britannica.com/eb/article-9074383.
- Fuengfusakul, Apinya (1 January 1993), "Empire of Crystal and Utopian Commune: Two Types of Contemporary Theravada Reform in Thailand", Sojourn, 8 (1): 153–83, JSTOR 41035731
- Harvey, Peter (1990). An introduction to Buddhism: Teachings, history and practices (1st ed.), Cambridge University Press. ISBN 0-521-31333-3.
- Harvey, Peter (2000), An Introduction to Buddhist Ethics: Foundations, Values and Issues (PDF), Cambridge University Press, ISBN 978-0-511-07584-1, archived from the original (PDF) on 2019-04-12
- Harvey, Peter (2013), An introduction to Buddhism: teachings, history and practices (2nd ed.), Cambridge University Press, ISBN 978-0-521-85942-4
- Kariyawasam, A.G.S. (1995). Buddhist Ceremonies and Rituals of Sri Lanka (The Wheel Publication No. 402/404). Kandy, Sri Lanka: Buddhist Publication Society. Retrieved 2007-10-22 from "Access to Insight" (1996 transcription) at http://www.accesstoinsight.org/lib/authors/kariyawasam/wheel402.html.
- Keown, Damien (2004), A Dictionary of Buddhism, Oxford University Press, ISBN 978-0-19-157917-2
- Keyes, C.F. (1989), "Buddhist Politics and Their Revolutionary Origins in Thailand", International Political Science Review, 10 (2): 121–42, doi:10.1177/019251218901000203, S2CID 145572706
- Mendis, N.K.G. (2001). The Questions of King Milinda: An Abridgement of the Milindapañha. Kandy: Buddhist Publication Society. ISBN 955-24-0067-8
- Nattier, Jan (2003). A Few Good Men: The Bodhisattva Path according to The Inquiry of Ugra (Ugraparpṛcchā). Honolulu: University of Hawai'i Press. ISBN 0-8248-2607-8.
- Tachibana, S. (1992), The Ethics of Buddhism, Curzon Press, ISBN 978-0-7007-0230-5
- Rhys Davids, T.W. & William Stede (eds.) (1921-5). The Pali Text Society's Pali–English dictionary. Chipstead: Pali Text Society. A general on-line search engine for the PED is available at http://dsal.uchicago.edu/dictionaries/pali/. Retrieved on 2006-12-26.
- Watson, Burton (1988), "Buddhism in the Poetry of Po Chü-i", The Eastern Buddhist, 21 (1): 1–22, JSTOR 44361818
