= Jetter =

Jetter may refer to:

- Amanda Jetter (born 1994), American artistic gymnast
- Bernhard Jetter (1862–1927), German-born soldier in the U.S. Army
- Ingrid Jetter, Argentine politician
- Martin Jetter (born 1959), German businessman
- Ukeme Awakessian Jetter, Nigerian-born American politician
- A pump that ejects a jet of fluid, such as a water jetter for sewer cleaning.

== See also ==
- Jeter, a surname (with a list of people of named Jeter)
- Jetta (disambiguation)
