= Jeta =

Jeta may refer to:

- Jeta Amata, Nigerian filmmaker
- Jeta (Guinea-Bissau), an island by the coast of Guinea-Bissau
- Jeta (film), an Indian Marathi language film
- Prince Jeta or Jetri or Jetrakumara, son of King Pasenadi of Kosala in ancient India, contemporary of Gautama Buddha and founder of the Jetavana Buddhist monastery

== See also ==
- Jetta (disambiguation)
