= Visakha =

Prominent lay disciple and patron of the Buddha

Visākhā
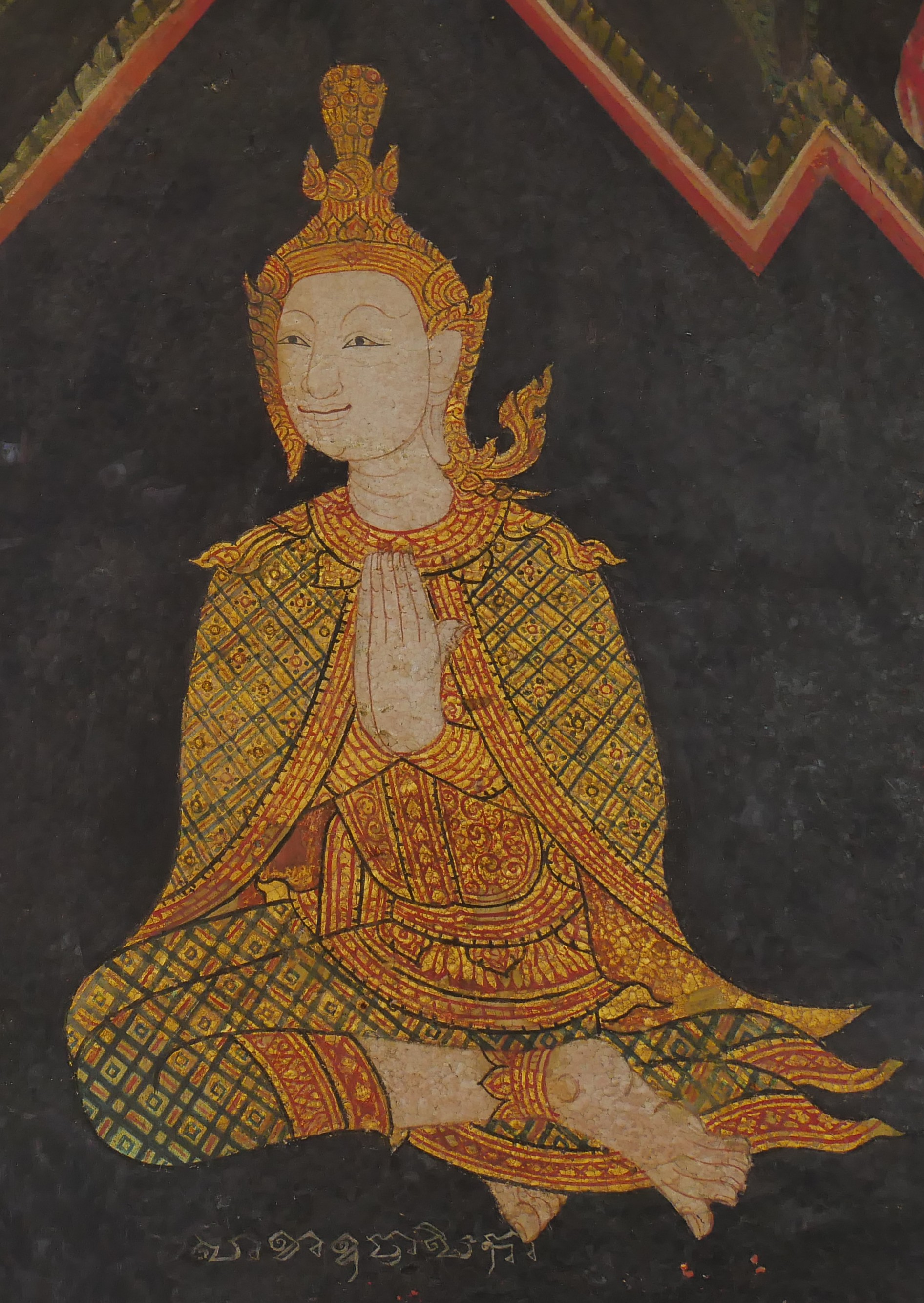
- Visakha, Pathum Wanaram Temple, Bangkok, Thailand
- Title: Chief Female Patron

Personal life
- Born: Bhadaiya, Magadha
- Spouse: Pūrnavardhana
- Other name: Migāramāta

Religious life
- Religion: Buddhism
- Profession: Upasika

Senior posting
- Teacher: Gautama Buddha

Visakha (Pali: Visākhā; Sanskrit: Viśākhā), also known as Migāramāta, was a wealthy aristocratic woman who lived during the time of the Buddha. She is considered the chief female patron of the Buddha. Visakha founded the vihāra of Migāramātupāsāda (meaning "Migaramata's Palace") in Savatthi, considered one of the two most important temples in the time of the historic Buddha, the other being Jetavana.

Visakha was born into a prominent and wealthy family in what was then the kingdom of Magadha. She met the Buddha at the age of seven when he visited her hometown and attained sotāpanna, a stage of enlightenment, after hearing him preach. Visakha and her family later moved to the city of Saketa (now Ayodhya) in Kosala, one of the mahajanapadas of ancient India. Visakha married her husband, Punnavaddhana, when she was sixteen, and then moved to Savatthi to live with his family. She famously converted her father-in-law, a wealthy treasurer named Migāra, to Buddhism, giving her the nickname Migāramāta ('Migāra's mother'). (Note: In Buddhism, one's spiritual mentor is sometimes respectfully referred to as one's parent. If the spiritual mentor is male he is referred to as "father", if the spiritual mentor is female she is referred to as "mother".)

As chief patron, Visakha generously supported the Buddha and his monastic community throughout her life and served as one of his primary aides in dealing with the general public. She is known as the female lay disciple of the Buddha who was foremost in generosity. Visakha was the Buddha's greatest patron and benefactor, along with her male counterpart, Anathapindika.

== Background ==
In Buddhist belief, when a fully enlightened Buddha appears in the world, he always has a set of chief disciples that fulfill different roles. On top of the pair of chief Arahant disciples, such as the Buddha's chief male disciples, Sariputta and Moggallana, and his chief female disciples Khema and Uppalavanna, all Buddhas have a set of chief patrons as well. Gautama Buddha's chief male patron was Anathapindika, with his chief female patron being Visakha.

According to the Pali Canon, in the time of Padumuttara Buddha, Visakha had been born the friend of a laywoman who was one of that Buddha's principal supporters. In that lifetime, the woman saw Padumattara Buddha declare a laywoman his female lay disciple foremost in generosity. Having heard this, the woman made the resolution to become the foremost female lay disciple of a future Buddha and to do good deeds for many lifetimes in hopes of becoming one. This wish came true in the time of the Buddha, when she was reborn as Visakha.

== Biography ==
=== Early life ===
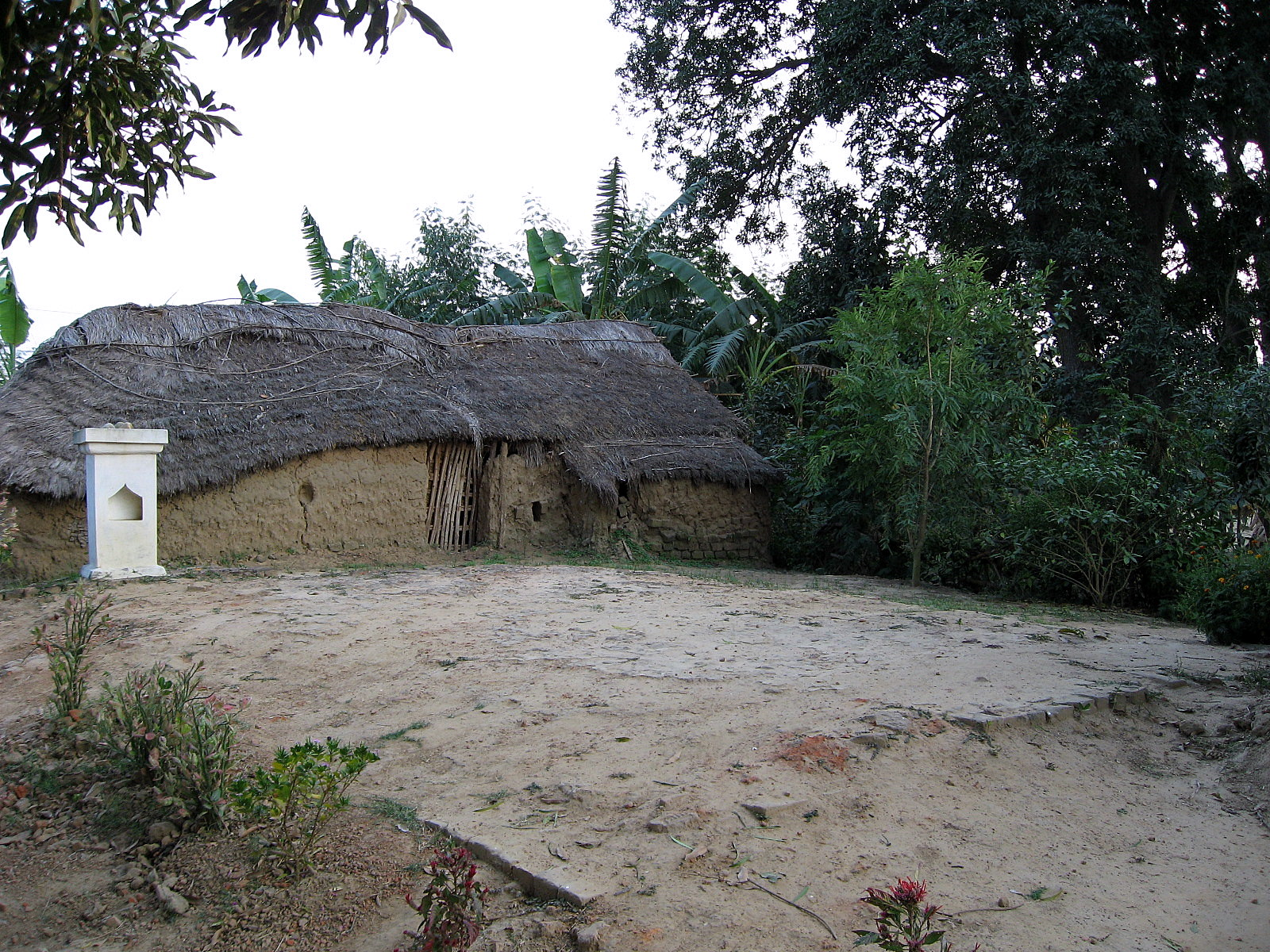
Stupa of Visakha, where her ashes were interred, in Sravasti

Visakha was born into a wealthy family, in the city of Bhaddiya in Anga, which at the time was part of the mahajanapada of Magadha. Her father was Dhanañjaya, and her mother Sumanā. According to Buddhist tradition, Visakha's family possessed special merit from her grandfather, Mendaka, having given his last meal to a paccekabuddha in a previous life, an act of merit the whole family partook in. Visakha met Gautama Buddha at the age of seven, when he was visiting her home town. When the Buddha taught her, she achieved the sotāpanna stage of enlightenment. Over the next two weeks, Mendaka invited the Buddha and his monks to eat at his house daily.

Visakha moved later in life when King Pasenadi of Kosala heard about this family of special merit. Pasenadi requested that his brother-in-law, King Bimbisara, send him some of the people of special merit in his kingdom so his subjects could see their example. Bimbasara obliged, and had Visakha and her father and mother moved to Saketa near the Kosalan capital of Savatthi.

=== Marriage ===
When Visakha was sixteen, a wealthy treasurer named Migara wished to find a wife for his son, Punnavaddhana. However, Punnavaddhanna did not want to marry and described a woman of beauty he thought was impossible to find as the only woman he would marry. Because of this, Migara hired a set of brahmins to find a woman that met Punnavaddhanna's description. The brahmins searched many cities until they found a festival in the city of Saketa. When it began to rain at the festival, everybody ran for cover except for Visakha, who walked to cover slowly. When the brahmins saw this they first ridiculed her as lazy. However, Visakha explained to them that she did not run because it was ungraceful for kings, royal elephants, monks, and women to run. She also explained that she did not want to injure herself, as wet clothes can be fixed, but if a woman of marriageable age breaks a limb she couldn't marry and would be a problem for her parents. (Note: In ancient India, there was a belief among wealthy families that unmarried women were considered to be a burden on their parents.) During this conversation, the brahmins noticed that Visakha had all of the traits Punnavaddhana described and they proposed to her on his behalf, which Visakha accepted.

On her wedding day her father wanted to give her cattle. After releasing several he stated that was enough and the gates be closed. However, the cattle behind the gate still followed her, jumping over the gate to reach her. According to Buddhist scripture this was because in a previous existence, Visakha made an offering of milk products to the monastic community of the previous Buddha, Kassapa. Despite the efforts by the monastics telling her that her gifts were enough she insisted on giving more. This merit is believed to have caused cattle to go to Visakha on her wedding day, despite efforts to stop them.

After her marriage, Visakha moved to Savatthi to live with her husband's family. Upon entering the city standing in her chariot, the people of Savatthi were amazed by her beauty and showered her with welcoming gifts. Upon receiving the gifts, Visakha redistributed the gifts back to the people of the city in an act of generosity.

=== Family ===
After Visakha moved into her husband's household her father-in-law, a follower of Jainism, became very irritated by Visakha's devout faith in Buddhism. Eventually, her father-in-law started looking to break up the marriage between his son and Visakha. One day, when a Buddhist renunciate had entered the household to ask for alms, Migāra ignored him, prompting Visakha to say, "Pass on, venerable sir, my father-in-law is eating stale food". Seeing this as an opportunity to get rid of her, her father-in-law asked that Visakha be expelled from the household. Arbitrators were called in, but Visakha explained that by her father-in-law eating food and not making merit for the future, he was using up past merit and not making any more, so it was like he was eating stale food. After hearing this, it was agreed that Visakha meant no disrespect. Visakha later convinced Migāra to see the Buddha, which led him to reach sotāpanna. Migāra was so grateful for Visakha helping him reach a stage of enlightenment he declared her his spiritual mother, earning her the nickname Migāramāta, or "Migāra's mother". (Note: Coincidentally, she also later had a son who she named Migara. Although this is not the reason her nickname was "Migara's mother".) Over time, she gradually got her entire household to become devout Buddhists.

Visakha had twenty children, ten sons and ten daughters, with each of her children having similarly large numbers of children themselves.

=== Chief Patron ===
According to Buddhist texts, Visakha was the Buddha's chief patron, along with Anathapindika, and was responsible for providing for the Sangha. The two chief patrons were also Gautama Buddha's primary aides in dealing with the general public, and he often turned to one of them whenever something needed to be arranged with the Sangha. Visakha regularly visited the Buddha in the afternoon for Dhamma sermons whenever he was in Savatthi, and fed large numbers of monks at her house daily. (Note: According to some texts 500, but in the Dhammapada commentary, 2,000.) When leaving the house, Visakha would assign one of her granddaughters to give alms in her place. The Buddha called Visakha's love of giving exemplary, and pointed to her as an example of an ideal benefactor, with both a love of giving and abundant wealth to give. He contrasted this with people who have wealth but don't give, who he called unwise and likened to flower garland makers who have many flowers but do not have the skills to make good flower garlands.

Visakha often wore her finest clothes and perfume to monasteries, though she later gained insight into the values of asceticism and chose to give up her fine attire. One day Visakha lost some jewelry which was found by Ānanda, who put it away for her. After realizing what happened, Visakha decided to sell the jewelry and use the proceeds to make merit. However, the jewelry was too expensive for anyone to buy, so she bought it herself out of her existing assets and set aside the money to build a monastery near Savatthi. As Visakha prepared to begin the construction of the monastery, she requested the Buddha stay in Savatthi for the construction, however, the Buddha needed to teach elsewhere and let her choose a monk to stay with her for the construction. Visakha chose Moggallana, the Buddha's disciple foremost in psychic powers, to stay with her and oversee the construction. Thanks to Moggallana's oversight and use of psychic powers to aid with the construction, the two-storey temple was built in nine months. The temple was known as Pubbārāma vihāra, often referred to as Migāramātupāsāda (literally, "Migaramata's Palace"). After the building of the vihāra, the Buddha would alternate between Migāramātupāsāda and Jetavana, the vihāra built by his chief male disciple Anathapindika, whenever he was staying in Savatthi. In total, the Buddha spent a total of six rainy seasons at Visakha's monastery, the second most of any monastery during his lifetime, surpassed only by Jetavana.

According to Buddhist scriptures, after her death, Visakha was reborn in Nimmānaratī, the fifth heavenly realm, as the consort of the deva king of the realm.

== Legacy ==
Visakha is considered to be one of the most prominent female lay figures in the Buddha's time and her role in the Buddhist scriptures is often cited in determining the attitudes toward women in early Buddhism. Religious studies scholar Nancy Falk states that "the grand heroine of Buddhist storytelling is not the nuns' founder, Mahapajapati, as one might expect, but Vishakha [sic], a daughter and wife who belonged to the early community and who never took the nuns' vows".

Historian L.S. Dewaraja points to the fact that Visakha often wore her best clothes to monasteries as indicating a more liberal attitude toward women in early Buddhism. Visakha was never chastised for her clothes and it was not until she personally developed an insight into non-attachment that she chose to give up the fine clothes on her own. Dewaraja contrasts this to other religions in Asia which generally describe pious women's love of ornamentation as "an evil attribute". Scholars cite the story of Visakha as evidence of a strong presence of female patronage in early Buddhism, and an indication of a strong value seen in the presence of female Buddhist donors. In fact, Buddhist studies scholar Peter Harvey notes that the majority of the stories in the Pali Canon of donors being reborn in the Buddhist heavenly realms are about women.

Parallels are often drawn between Visakha and the Buddha's chief male benefactor, Anathapindika. Religious studies scholar Todd Lewis describes Visakha and Anathapindika as some of the most popular figures in Buddhist art and storytelling in Asian Buddhist tradition. The two patrons each play parallel roles, both being called upon to arrange things with the lay community, both building important temples for the Buddha, and both pursuing various types of giving for the Sangha. Any form of giving that one of the benefactors pursued was also performed by the other. Falk calls them a "matched pair of 'perfect' male and female donors". Harvey states that this symbiotic parallel relationship between the two chief patrons implies that no form of giving in Buddhism is gender specific.

== See also ==
- Anathapindika
- Dāna
- Khujjuttarā
- Velukandakiya
