= Jetbook =

Jetbook may refer to:

- ECTACO jetBook, a line of eBook readers
- A line of notebook computers by Jetta
