= Jetta =

Jetta may refer to:

== Automobiles ==
- Jetta (car brand), a car marque by FAW-Volkswagen
- Volkswagen Jetta, a German compact sedan

== People ==
- Jetta (musician), British musician
- Jetta (wrestler), British professional wrestler

=== Given name ===
- Jetta Carleton (1913–1999), American novelist
- Jetta Goudal (1891–1985), Dutch-American actress
- Jetta Klijnsma (born 1957), Dutch politician

=== Surname ===
- Kurt Jetta (born 1961), American consumer researcher
- Leroy Jetta (born 1988), Australian footballer, Essendon Football Club
- Lewis Jetta (born 1989), Australian footballer, Sydney Swans
- Neville Jetta (born 1990), Australian footballer, Melbourne Football Club

== Other uses ==
- 544 Jetta, an asteroid
- Jetta (company), an American company operating in the notebooks market
- Jetta: Tales of the Toshigawa, an independently created comic book
- Jetta of the 21st Century, a 1952–1953 comic book created and drawn by Dan DeCarlo.
- Jetta Handover, a fictional character in the TV series Clifford the Big Red Dog; see List of Clifford the Big Red Dog episodes

== See also ==
- Jeddah
- Jeta (disambiguation)
- Jetter (disambiguation)
