= Puti Zushi =

Character in the Chinese novel Journey to the West

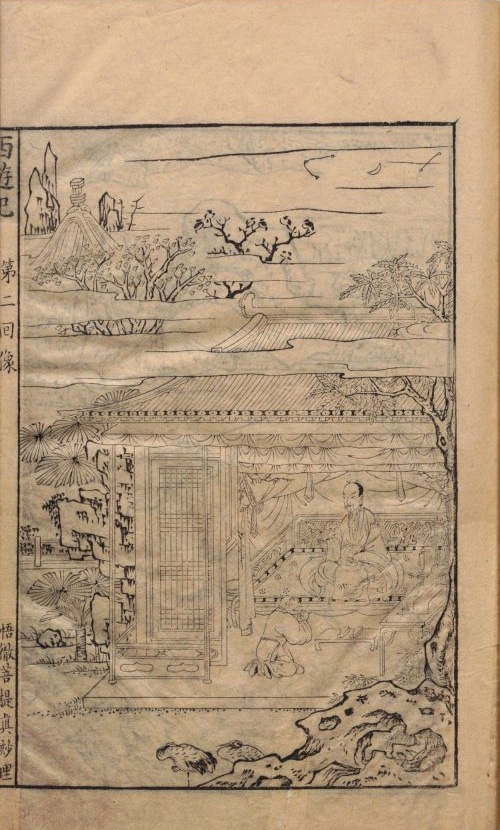
- Puti Zushi teaching Sun Wukong
- Traditional Chinese: 菩提祖師
- Simplified Chinese: 菩提祖师
Transcriptions
Standard Mandarin
- Hanyu Pinyin: Pútí Zǔshī

Puti Zushi (simplified Chinese: 菩提祖师; traditional Chinese: 菩提祖師; pinyin: Pútí Zǔshī), also called Subhuti Zushi (須菩提祖師), is a character in the 16th-century Chinese novel Journey to the West. He is the first teacher of Sun Wukong, whom he names and teaches the secrets of immortality, the seventy-two transformations, and the somersault cloud. His name comes from the Buddhist figure Subhūti, but his teachings include both Buddhist and Daoist ideas.

== Role in the novel ==
Puti Zushi lives in the Cave of the Slanted Moon and Three Stars (斜月三星洞) on Spirit Tower and Square Inch Mountain (靈臺方寸山). Sun Wukong finds his home after spending several years searching for a way to escape death. A woodcutter tells him where the immortal lives, and a young attendant leads him into the cave.

Puti asks the monkey about his family and where he came from. After learning that he was born from a stone, he accepts him as a disciple and gives him the name Sun Wukong. The monkey then lives at the cave, studying scriptures and doing daily work alongside the other disciples.

After six or seven years, Wukong asks his master to teach him how to live forever. Puti offers him several forms of religious practice, but Wukong refuses each one when he learns that it cannot give him immortality. Puti strikes him three times on the head and leaves through the rear door. Wukong understands this as a secret instruction to visit him at the third watch of the night.

Puti then teaches Wukong a method of achieving immortality. Three years later, he teaches him the seventy-two transformations so that he can survive the Three Calamities. He also teaches Wukong the somersault cloud, which allows him to travel 108,000 li in a single leap.

One day, Wukong changes into a pine tree to amuse the other disciples. When Puti learns what happened, he orders Wukong to leave. He warns him that showing off his powers will bring trouble and forbids him from revealing his teacher's name. Wukong returns to Mount Huaguo and does not meet Puti again in the novel.

== Interpretations ==
=== Religious identity ===
Puti Zushi's name comes from Subhūti, one of the chief disciples of the Buddha. In the Diamond Sutra, Subhūti discusses the nature of emptiness with the Buddha. In Journey to the West, Puti teaches both Buddhist and Daoist ideas. His lectures also draw on Confucianism. Chinese literary scholar Liu Tingqian describes him as a teacher who does not belong to any one religious school.

Hoong Teik Toh also examines Puti's Buddhist identity. He identifies the name Xuputi (須菩提) with Subhūti and connects the title Puti Zushi with Bodhidharma, the traditional founder of Chan Buddhism. Toh discusses a Tibetan Buddhist tradition in which Bodhidharma was identified with Dampa Sangye, an Indian Buddhist teacher. He uses these traditions to examine the Buddhist background of Wukong's teacher.

The novel also draws on the story of the Chan master Huineng. In the Platform Sutra, Hongren strikes a rice mortar three times as a secret signal for Huineng to visit him at night. Puti uses a similar signal before teaching Wukong the secrets of immortality. The parallel has been discussed in studies of the Buddhist sources of Journey to the West.

=== The mind and the hidden teacher ===
Puti's home is named Spirit Tower and Square Inch Mountain (靈臺方寸山), with the Cave of the Slanted Moon and Three Stars (斜月三星洞). Both names refer to the mind. The words lingtai (靈臺) and fangcun (方寸) were used for the mind in Chinese writing, while the slanted moon and three stars form the shape of the Chinese character xin (心), meaning "heart" or "mind". Liu Tingqian reads these names as references to the cultivation of the mind.

Liu also describes Puti as a great hermit (大隐). Unlike immortals who seek fame and high rank, Puti lives away from the heavenly court and keeps his identity hidden. Even after Wukong becomes a powerful figure, the gods do not know who taught him. Liu sees Puti's refusal of fame as an important part of his character.

== Other appearances ==
=== Theatre ===
Puti Zushi appears in the Qing dynasty chuanqi play Shengping Baofa (昇平寶筏). In the fifth scene of the first part, the stone monkey arrives at Spirit Tower and Square Inch Mountain and becomes Puti's disciple. Puti gives him the name Sun Wukong and teaches him how to become immortal.

=== Television ===
In the 1986 television series Journey to the West, Wukong returns to his master's former home after destroying Zhenyuan Daxian's ginseng fruit tree. He hears Puti's voice advising him to seek help from Guanyin. This scene does not appear in the novel.

Puti Zushi also appears in the 2014 film The Monkey King.

== Worship and local traditions ==
=== Longxuyan Temple ===
Puti Zushi is worshipped at Longxuyan (龍鬚岩), a temple on Xiangyun Mountain in Nan'an, Fujian. A statue of the patriarch sits in the main hall. The statue has a dark face, wears a Buddhist robe and a five-Buddha crown, and sits on a lotus seat.

According to local tradition, a monk from India made an image of Puti in 606. The image was first kept at Qing泰 Temple in Zhangzhou and was later moved to other temples before reaching Xiangyun Mountain. Local accounts say that the original statue was destroyed in 1966. Villagers made a replacement in 1983.

Worshippers visit Longxuyan throughout the year. On the fourth day of the first lunar month, local people hold a procession and offer incense to Puti Zushi. The annual ceremony was added to Nan'an's municipal list of intangible cultural heritage in 2021.

=== Subhūti stele in Beijing ===
A Ming dynasty stele from Yanshou Temple (延寿寺) in Fengtai District, Beijing, bears a portrait of Subhūti. The inscription beside the portrait names him as Subhūti (須菩提). The stele was erected in 1640 and is now kept at the Beijing Stone Carving Art Museum.

The portrait became known as the "Wukong's Master Stele" (悟空师父碑) because Subhūti shares his name with Puti Zushi in Journey to the West. The image itself comes from an older Buddhist tradition.

== See also ==
- Sun Wukong
- Subhūti
- Zhenyuan Daxian
