= Jethro =

- Gender: Male

Origin
- Meaning: "Excellence”
- Region of origin: English-speaking world, Jewish given name

Other names
- Related names: Hebrew: Yithrô (Yiṯrô, Yisrô, Yisroy); Italian: Ietro; French: Jéthro; Dutch: Jetro, Jeter; Russian: Иофор Iofor (Yofor, Jofor); Arabic: شعيب Shu‘ayb, Sho‘ayb, Shu'aib; Turkish: Şuayb

Jethro is a male given name meaning "excellence". It is derived from the Hebrew word Yithrô.

== Notable people named Jethro ==
- Kenneth C. "Jethro" Burns (1920–1989), American mandolin player in satirical country music duo Homer and Jethro
- Jethro Franklin (born 1965), American football coach
- Jethro J. McCullough (1810–1878), American politician and businessman
- Jethro Pugh (1944–2015), American football player
- Jethro Rostedt (born 1976), Finnish real estate agent and businessman
- Jethro Justinian Harris Teall (1849–1924), British geologist
- Jethro Tull (agriculturist) (1674–1741), British agricultural pioneer
- Jethro Sumner (1733–1785), officer in the American Continental Army
- Jetro Willems (born 1994), Dutch footballer
- Jethro (comedian) (1948–2021), British stand-up comedian, born Geoffrey Rowe

=== In sacred texts ===
- Jethro (biblical figure), the father-in-law of Moses
  - Yitro (parsha)
  - Jethro in rabbinic literature
  - Shuaib (Jethro in Islam)

=== Fictional characters ===
- Jethro, a character in OK K.O.! Let's Be Heroes
- Jethro, a character in the game GTA: San Andreas
- Jethro (Jerom in the original version), a character in the Belgian comic book series Spike and Suzy
- Jethro Bodine, a character in the American sitcom The Beverly Hillbillies
- Albert Jethro 'A.J.' Chegwidden, a character in JAG
- Jethro Creighton, a character in the novel Across Five Aprils
- Jethro Cane, a character in the Doctor Who episode "Midnight"
- Leroy Jethro Gibbs, a character in NCIS
- Jethro Q. Walrustitty, a character in the Monty Python's Flying Circus sketch "Election Night Special"
- Jethro West, a character in Outrageous Fortune
- Jethro, a character in Micro Machines V3
- Jethro "Jet" Bradley, a character in the video game Tron 2.0
- Jethro Jefferson, a character in the Discworld novel Snuff

== See also ==
- Jethro Tull (band), a mainly 20th-century multiple gold-and-platinum record-releasing British rock group named after the agriculturalist
