= Geter =

Geter is a surname. Notable people with the surname include:

- Chad Geter (born 1994), American football player
- Lewis Geter (born 1969), American basketball player

== See also ==
- Jeter
