= Anathapindika =

Prominent lay disciple and patron of the Buddha

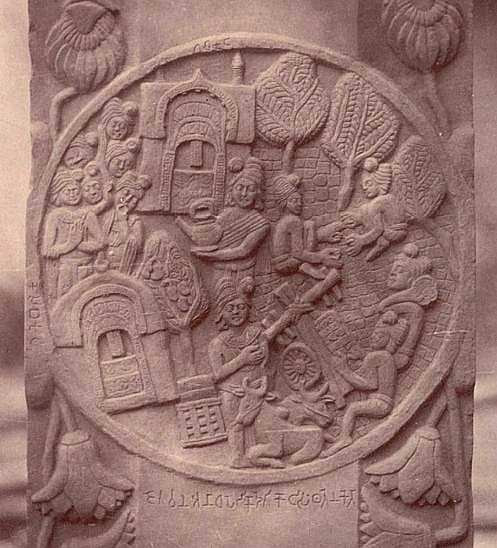
- Anathapindika covers Jetavana with coins (Bharhut, Brahmi text: jetavana ananthapindiko deti kotisanthatena keta
- Title: Chief Male Patron

Personal life
- Spouse: Puññalakkhanā
- Children: Kāla, Mahā-Subhaddā, Cūla-Subhaddā and Sumanā
- Other name: Sudatta

Religious life
- Religion: Buddhism
- Profession: Merchant, banker

Senior posting
- Teacher: Gautama Buddha

Anathapindika (Pali: Anāthapiṇḍika; Sanskrit: Anāthapiṇḍada), born Sudatta, was a wealthy merchant, banker, and philanthropist, believed to have been the wealthiest merchant in Savatthi in the time of Gautama Buddha. He is considered to have been the chief male patron of the Buddha. Anathapindika founded the Jetavana Monastery in Savatthi, considered one of the two most important temples in the time of the historic Buddha, the other being Migāramātupāsāda.

Anathapindika was born into a wealthy merchant family in Savatthi with the birth name Sudatta, and was a relative of Subhūti, one of the Buddha's principal disciples. He became widely known by the nickname Anathapindika, literally "one who gives alms (piṇḍa) to the unprotected (anātha)", due to his reputation of loving to give to those in need. Anathapindika met the Buddha while on a business trip in Rājagaha after being told about him by his brother-in-law. He reached sotapanna, a stage of enlightenment, after listening to the Buddha preach. Following the encounter, Anathapindika became a devoted lay follower and purchased land to build the Jetavana Monastery from the prince of Kosala by covering the park grounds with coins. After building Jetavana Monastery, Anathapindika continued to generously support the Buddha and his monastic community throughout his life and became known as the Buddha's greatest patron and benefactor along with his female counterpart, Visakha.

As chief patron, Anathapindika fed large numbers of the Buddha's monks daily and regularly maintained and supplied Jetavana Monastery, as well as served as one of the Buddha's primary aides in dealing with the general public. He is known as the male lay disciple of the Buddha who was foremost in generosity. Anathapindika is frequently referred to as Anathapindika-setthi (setthi meaning "wealthy person" or "millionaire"), and is sometimes referred to as Mahā Anāthapindika to distinguish him from Cūla Anāthapindika, another disciple of the Buddha.

== Background ==
In Buddhist belief, when a fully enlightened Buddha appears in the world, he always has a set of chief disciples that fulfill different roles. On top of the pair of chief Arahant disciples such as Gautama Buddha's chief male disciples Sariputta and Moggallana, and his chief female disciples Khema and Uppalavanna, all Buddhas have a set of chief patrons as well. Gautama Buddha's chief male patron was Anathapindika, with his chief female patron being Visakha.

According to the Pali Canon, in the time of Padumuttara Buddha, a householder was inspired when Padumattara Buddha spoke of his own lay disciple who was foremost in generosity. The householder then resolved in that lifetime to become the disciple foremost in generosity of a future Buddha himself, and did many good deeds in hopes of becoming one. His wish was fulfilled in this lifetime when he was reborn as Anathapindika and became the chief patron of Gautama Buddha.

== Biography ==
=== Early life and family ===
Anathapindika was born with the given name Sudatta and was the son of a wealthy merchant named Sumana. He was a relative of Subhūti, who would later become the disciple of the Buddha who was foremost in being worthy of gifts (dakkhiṇeyyānaṃ). (Note: Pali texts state Subhūti was Anathapindika's younger brother, while northern Buddhist texts identify him as Anathapindika's nephew.) When Sudatta grew up, he married a woman named Puññalakkhanā, the sister of a wealthy merchant in Rājagaha. Sudatta was known for his generosity even before his conversion to Buddhism, and was known to the public by the nickname "Anathapindika", or "one who gives alms to the unprotected", due to his love for giving. Anathapindika had one son, Kāla, and three daughters, Mahā-Subhaddā, Cūla-Subhaddā and Sumanā. His daughter-in-law was Sujātā, the youngest sister of his female counterpart, Visakha.

=== Meeting the Buddha ===
Buddhist texts describe Anathapindika's first encounter with the Buddha as being in Rājagaha. While on business, Anathapindika went to visit his brother-in-law, who was already a follower of the Buddha. When he arrived at his brother-in-law's house, he noticed that the household was preparing for an elaborate feast, and mistook it as preparation for a wedding or a visit from the king. When Anathapindika asked about the preparations, his brother-in-law explained that they were preparing for a visit from the Buddha (the Enlightened One) and his monks. Upon hearing this, Anathapindika became overjoyed, exclaiming "You mean that a fully enlightened being had arisen in the world?", and immediately resolved to go meet him.

The following day Anathapindika arose early to meet the Buddha, but realized it was still dark. He still continued however, after a friendly yakka whispered in his ear and urged him to continue. Anathapindika eventually reached a figure which called him "Sudatta" and asked him to come forward. Surprised to hear his birth name, which was not known to the public, he concluded it could only be the Buddha, and went forward. The Buddha then had a discussion with him and expounded the Four Noble Truths, afterwards Anathapindika achieved the state of sotapanna, a stage of enlightenment.

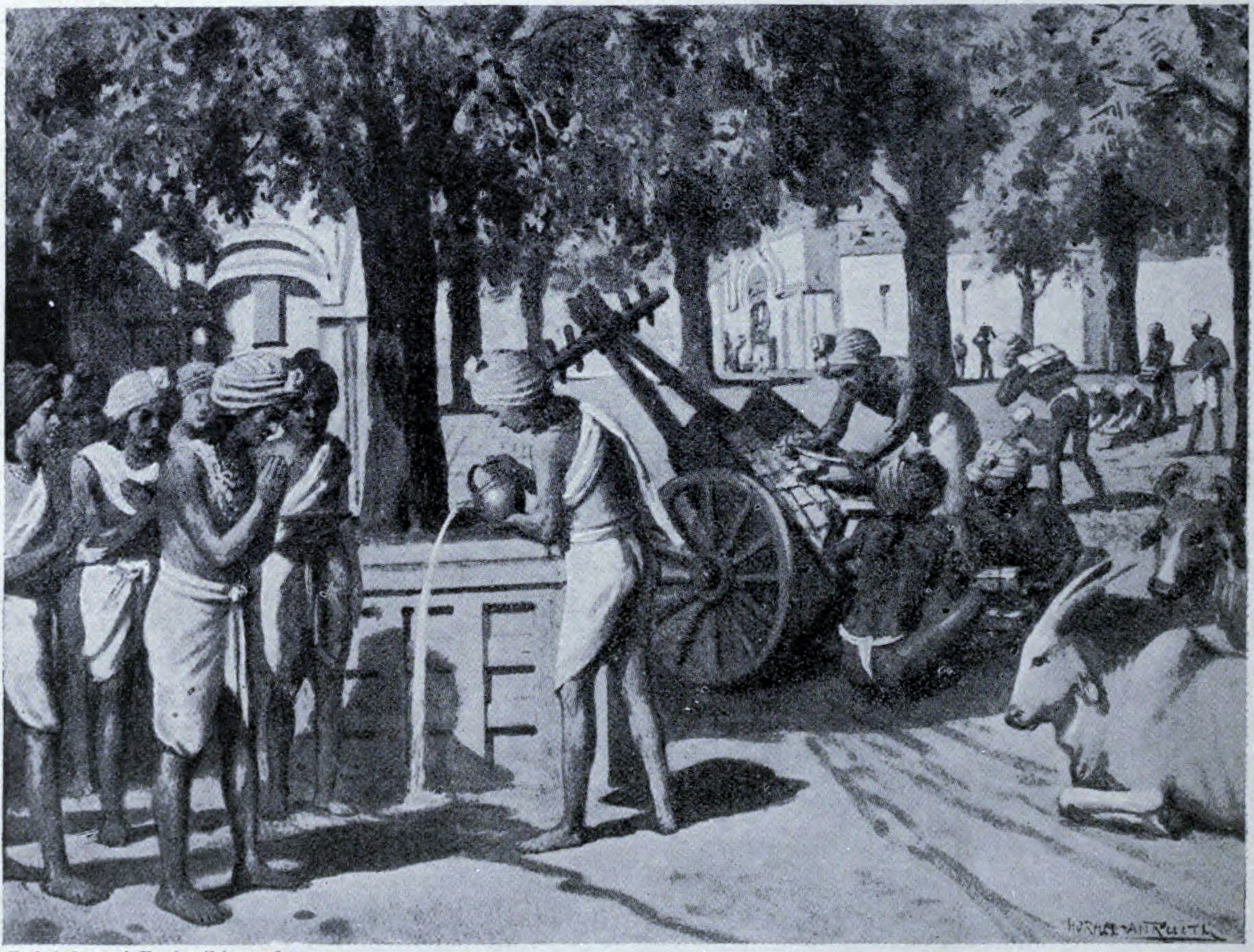
Anathapindika's great act of charity

=== Building Jetavana Monastery ===
Following Anathapindika's first encounter with the Buddha, he requested to offer him a meal, which the Buddha accepted, and then asked to build a temple for him and his monks in his hometown of Savatthi, to which the Buddha agreed.

Shortly after, Anathapindika went back to Savatthi to search for a place to build the monastery. Looking for a place that was both accessible to followers and peacefully secluded, he came across a park belonging to Prince Jeta, the son of King Pasenadi of Kosala. Anathapindika offered to buy the park from the prince but the prince refused, after Anathapindika persisted, the prince said he will sell him the park if he covers it with coins, thinking nobody would accept such a price. To the prince's surprise, Anathapindika agreed.

When Prince Jeta stated that he was not being serious and still would not sell the park, Anathapindika and the prince went to arbitrators who concluded that Prince Jeta had to sell the park at the agreed price. (Note: Some sources state that Prince Jeta said that he would sell the park not even if Anathapindika covered the park with a large price of coins, but arbitrators still ruled in favor of Anathapindika. According to Indologist Hans Wolfgang Schumann, the court decided that naming a price, even in a refusing way, constituted a sale since one who didn't want to sell would not name a price. In another source Prince Jeta refuses to sell altogether and it is the arbitrator that states Anathapindika can purchase the park if he covers the grounds with money.) The coins Anathapindika brought covered all of the park except for one spot at the entrance. Anathapindika sent the order for more pieces to be brought, but having been inspired by the merchant's resolve and wanting to share in the merit of the offering, Prince Jeta donated the remaining land and offered to build a wall and gate for the monastery as well as provide trees for timber. Afterwards, Anathapindika spent several million more pieces building the temple and its furnishings. According to German Pali scholar Hellmuth Heckler, the merchant ended up spending about three-fifths of his total fortune purchasing the land and building the temple that would come to be known as Jetavana (literally "Jeta's Wood" or "Jeta's Grove"). The temple is often referred to in Buddhist scriptures as "Anathapindika's Monastery in Jeta's Wood" to give recognition to both benefactors.

=== Chief patron ===
The Buddha designated Anathapindika as his chief patron, along with Visakha. He is considered to be the male Buddhist lay disciple who was foremost in generosity. Buddhist texts relate that throughout his life, Anathapindika regularly sent food, medicine and supplies to Jetavana monastery, as well as received monks at his house for alms daily. (Note: Some sources indicate the number of monks as being in the hundreds, but the Dhammapada commentary states 2,000 daily.) The temple was also regularly maintained by Anathapindika's servants. When Anathapindika was away from home, he would assign his oldest daughter to give alms in his place.

Whenever the Buddha was in Savatthi, Anathapindika would visit him twice a day. After first meeting the Buddha, Anathapindika committed to following the teachings and strictly observing the five precepts, as well as encouraged his family, friends, employees, and everybody around him to do the same. According to Buddhist commentaries, Anathapindika never asked the Buddha a question, out of fear of troubling him. Instead the Buddha would preach to him on his own accord. Anathapindika was also well versed in the Dhamma, and an excellent debater. Buddhist scriptures describe a time when he visited a temple of another religious tradition and a debate ensues, with Anathapindika skillfully defeating the followers of the other religious tradition.

Anathapindika and Visakha were not only the greatest donors to Gautama Buddha but also his primary aides when dealing with the general public. The Buddha frequently turned to one of the two chief patrons whenever there needed to be something arranged with the lay community.

=== Encounter with the Earth Deva ===
According to texts, at one time Anathapindika lost a significant amount of his fortune in a flash flood which washed away large amounts of his gold, and was reduced to poverty due to his love of giving as well as due to lending out large amounts to his friends. Despite this, Anathapindika continued his patronage and support of Buddhism, although more modestly. It is said he later returned to his wealthy status, however, due to the help of a redemptive deva, or deity.

Based on accounts from the Buddhist scriptures, there was a deva living in Anathapindika's house at the time. According to the laws of his realm, the deva had to leave his abode whenever the Buddha or a monk was in the house, as a form of respect. Annoyed by this, the deva appeared before Anathapindika and suggested he preserve his remaining treasure and stop his patronage of Buddhism since he was no longer wealthy. Appalled by this suggestion, Anathapindika explained that the only treasures he knew of were the Three Jewels; the Buddha, the Dhamma, and the Sangha, and that he would continue to support Buddhism so long as he had something to give. Anathapindika then ordered the deva to leave his house, stating that enemies of the Buddha were not welcome, forcing the deva to find a new place to live. The homeless deva went to several authorities, eventually reaching Sakka, the king of the devas in Trāyastriṃśa, who suggested he must atone by retrieving Anathapindika's lost gold, convincing his debtors to repay their debts, and by giving Anathapindika a buried treasure, which had no owner. This resulted in Anathapindika returning to wealth, even richer than he was before.

=== The Story of Kalakanni ===
One famous story described in the Buddhist scriptures is the story of Kalakanni. Kalakanni (whose name means "unlucky bird") was a childhood friend of Anathapindika who was impoverished. When Kalakanni asked Anathapindika for aid, the setthi offered him a job at his house. This decision was met with backlash from Anathapindika's household, due to Kalakanni's low status and the superstition at the time of Kalakanni's name being a bad omen. Anathapindika ignored this superstition and his status however, and granted his friend a job. This eventually worked in the favor of the household however, when a group of thieves attempted to rob Anathapindika while he was away on a business trip. When the vigilant Kalakanni noticed the thieves, he started making loud noises, convincing the thieves that the household was full and causing them to leave.

=== Death ===
When Anathapindika grew ill later in life he was visited by Sariputta and Ananda, two of the Buddha's principal disciples. Sariputta delivered a sermon, recommending Anathapindika focus on freeing his mind from clinging and to reflect on the impermanence of existence. The setthi later proclaimed this sermon to have been the most profound sermon he has ever heard, which Sariputta explained was because this teaching was not normally given to laypeople. Shortly after Sariputta and Ananda left, Anathapindika died. According to the Buddhist scriptures, Anathapindika was reborn as a deva in Tusita heaven after his death, where he would live as long as his female counterpart Visakha, and the king of Tavatimsa heaven, Sakka.

== Legacy ==
Anathapindika is considered to be one of the most exemplary adherents of the Buddhist virtue of generosity. Not only did he regularly provide alms and necessities to the monks at Jetavana, he hosted hundreds of monks at his residence for meals daily. Referring to Anathapindika, the Buddha stated that for one who was dedicated to perfecting the virtue of generosity, nothing in the world is capable of stopping him from giving.

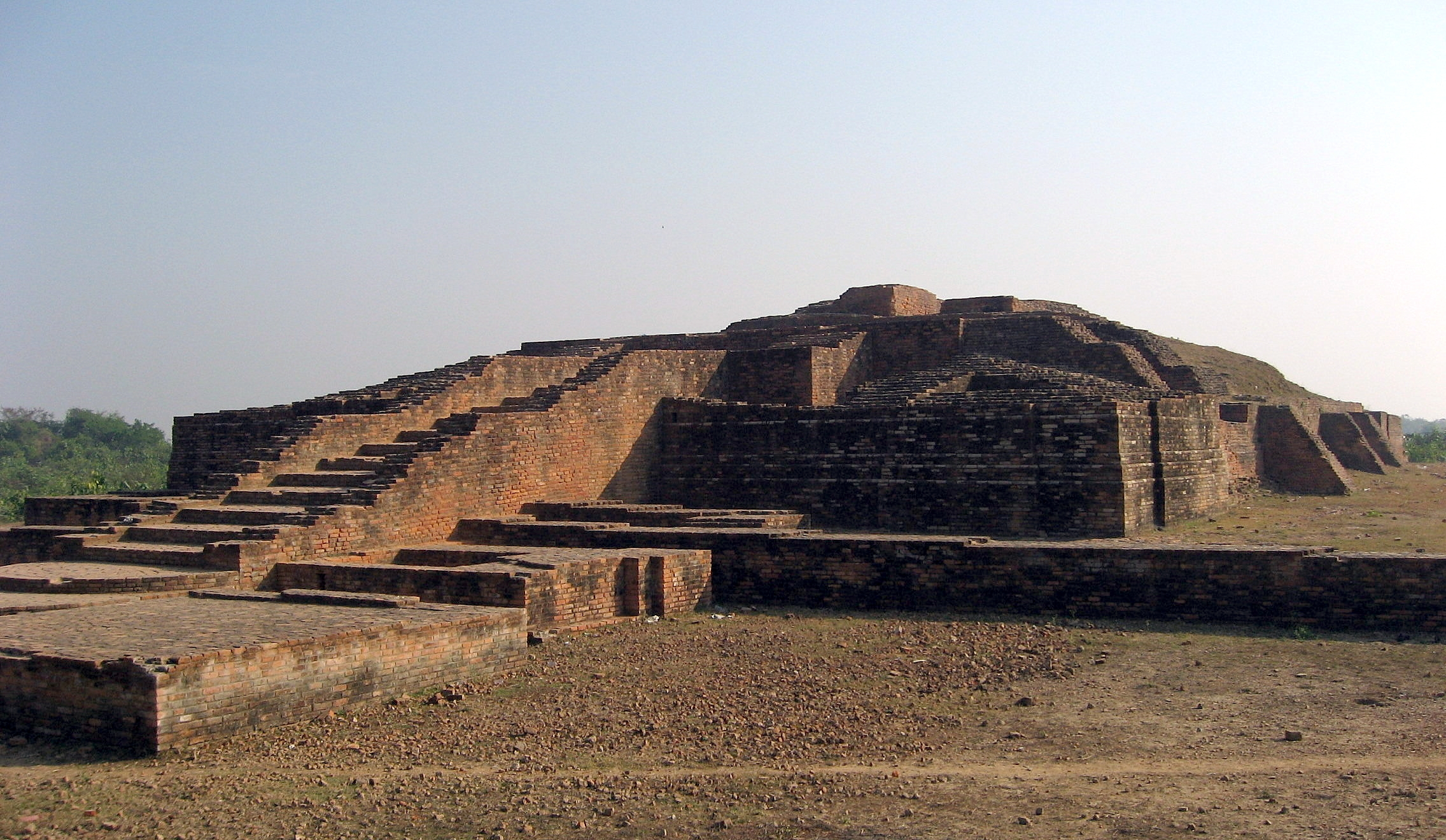
Anathapindika Stupa or Sudatta Stupa in Sravasti (Savatthi)

Anathapindika's love of giving, combined with some misfortune, at one point reduced the setthi to poverty. But even in times of hardship, Anathapindika was described as continuing his patronage of Buddhism, although with much more modest gifts. His wealth was eventually restored to him however, due to the power of the merit of his generosity.

Anathapindika's patronage had a significant impact on Buddhism. Anathapindika's hometown of Savatthi was considered to be the center of Buddhism at the time, being the location of a significant number of the Buddha's sermons. On top of that, the Buddha spent nineteen rainy seasons at Jetavana monastery, more than any other temple during his lifetime. After the building of Migāramātupāsāda monastery in Savatthi by Visakha, the Buddha would alternate between Anathapindika's monastery and Visakha's monastery whenever he was staying in Savatthi. Anathapindika's generosity even inspired King Pasenadi, another follower of the Buddha, to himself start generous patronage of Buddhism.

According to religious studies scholar Todd Lewis, Anathapindika is one of the most popular figures in Buddhist art and storytelling in Asian Buddhist tradition. Buddhist scholars George D. Bond and Ananda W.P Guruge, point to the story of Anathapindika as evidence that the Buddhist path for lay people and the rewards of generosity in Buddhism are not distinct from the path to Nirvana that is the focus of Buddhist monastics.

== See also ==
- Savaka
- Visakha
- Dāna
- Citta
- Hatthaka
