= Setthi =

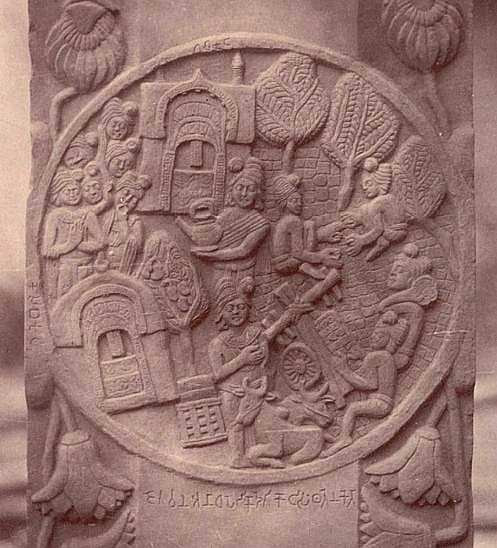
Anathapindika the "Setthi" covers Jetavana with coins. Bharhut, Brahmi text: "jetavana ananthapindiko deti kotisanthatena keta".

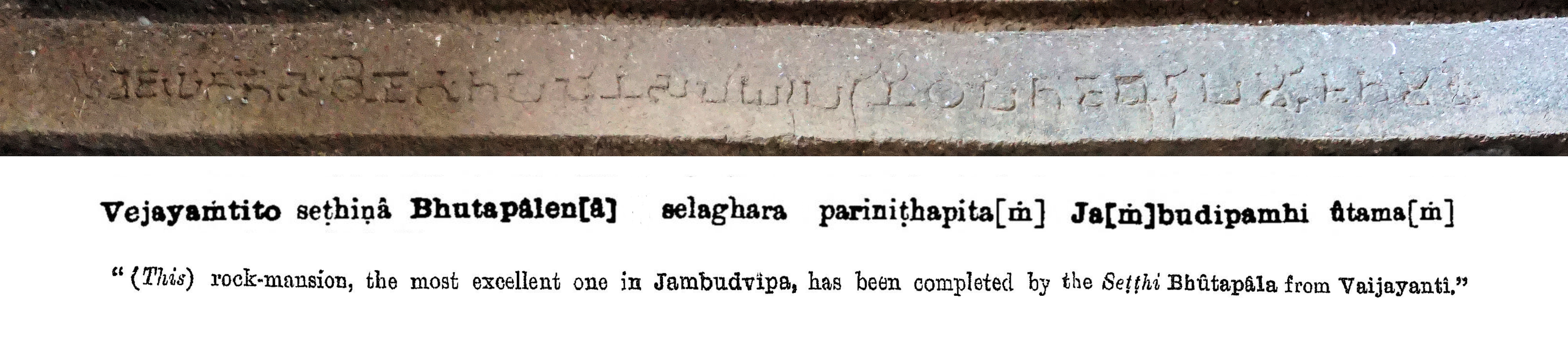
Verandah inscription mentioning the completion by the setthi Bhutapala

Setthi (Pali: seṭṭhi, Brahmi script: 𑀲𑁂𑀢𑁆𑀣𑀺) is a Pali word, often used in Buddhist scriptures and inscriptions, meaning a "foreman of a guild, treasurer, banker, 'city man', wealthy merchant" or "millionaire".

Anathapindika, the main patron of the Buddha, was often referred to as Anathapindika-setthi, meaning Anathapindika, the wealthy one or the millionaire.

The setthi Bhutapala, from Vaijayanti, one of the main patrons of the Karla Caves, left an inscription among the sculpted decorations on the veranda of the Chaitya, mentioning his completion of the cave. The completion of the cave mentioned by Bhutapala may refer to the ornate sculptures of the veranda, during the final phase of decoration.
