= Prince Jeta =

Prince Jeta (Chinese: 祇陀; pinyin: Qítuó), also known as Jeta Kumara (Chinese: 祇陀太子), was a prince of Kosala and the son of King Pasenadi. He donated the grove that became the Jetavana Buddhist monastery.

== Life ==
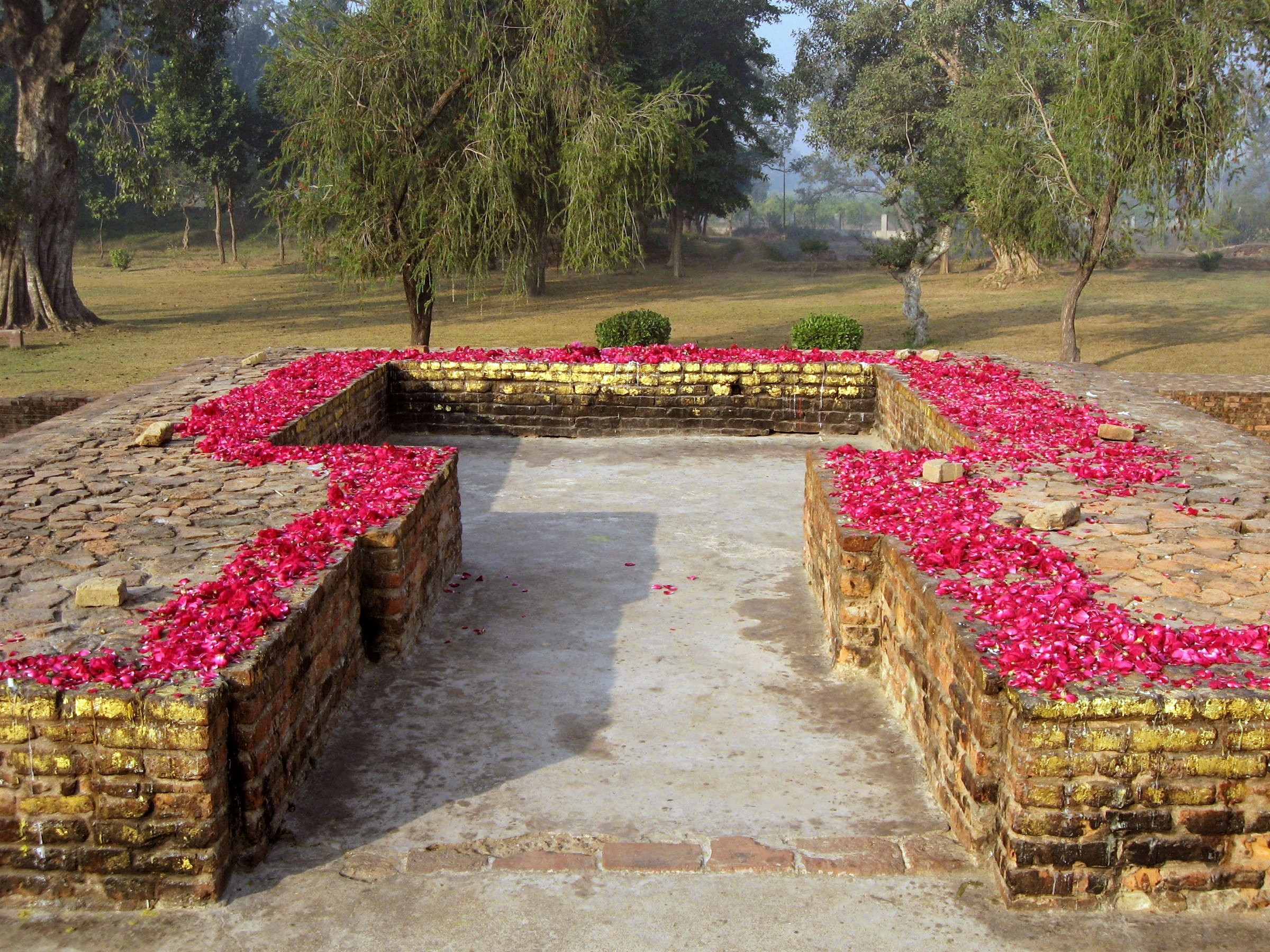
Mulagandhakuti. The remains of the Buddha's hut at Jetavana.

Prince Jeta owned a pleasure grove near Sravasti, the capital of Kosala. The wealthy merchant Anathapindika wanted to buy the grove and offer it to Gautama Buddha and his monastic community. Jeta initially refused to sell it and jokingly said that he would sell it if Anathapindika could cover the ground with gold coins. Anathapindika accepted the condition and covered most of the ground with gold. Jeta then offered the remaining part of the property and its trees to the Buddha and had an entrance gate built. The resulting monastery became known as Jetavana, or "Jeta's Grove, Anāthapiṇḍada's Park".

Later, Jeta's younger half-brother, Virudhaka (琉璃王), overthrew their father, King Prasenajit, and took the throne of Kosala. After Virudhaka's campaign against the Shakya clan in Kapilavastu, he returned to Sravasti. According to one account, he found Jeta enjoying music and entertainment and became angry because he had been fighting while Jeta remained at leisure. Virudhaka feared that Jeta might take the throne if he was defeated and killed him with his sword. According to Buddhist accounts, Jeta was reborn in the heavenly realms because of his past merit.

== In classical literature ==
Prince Jeta appears as the later incarnation of Fa Jie (法戒), a character in the Ming dynasty novel Investiture of the Gods (Fengshen Yanyi). In the novel, Fa Jie is a practitioner from Penglai Island who becomes involved in the war between the Shang and Zhou forces. He is defeated by the Zhou forces and sentenced to death.

Before his execution, the Western Sect leader Zhunti Daoren (准提道人) arrives and asks Jiang Ziya to spare him. Zhunti says that Fa Jie is not named on the Investiture of the Gods and has a connection with the West. Fa Jie is then taken to the West and becomes a follower of the Western Sect. The novel later states that Fa Jie was reborn in Sravasti as Prince Jeta and attained spiritual fruition.

== Interpretations ==
Literary scholar Kazuo Yamashita notes that, compared with Buddhist figures such as Guanyin, Manjushri, and Samantabhadra, Prince Jeta is a relatively minor figure, making his appearance in Fengshen Yanyi unusual. He suggests that the inclusion of Jeta may be connected to popular Cundi devotion. In particular, Yamashita notes that Jetavana is described as a place where the Buddha preached in the Cundi Sutra, and that an illustration in the popular Cundi Jingye depicts Jeta and Anathapindika listening to the Buddha. He therefore suggests that the author of Fengshen Yanyi may have drawn on this tradition when incorporating Jeta into the novel.
