= Zhenyuan Daxian =

Chinese immortals

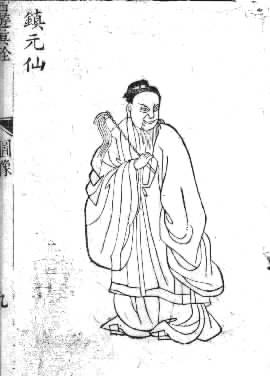
- An illustration of Zhenyuan Daxian
- Traditional Chinese: 鎮元大仙
- Simplified Chinese: 镇元大仙
- Literal meaning: The Great Immortal Zhenyuan
Transcriptions
Standard Mandarin
- Hanyu Pinyin: Zhènyuán Dàxiān

Zhenyuan Daxian (Chinese: 镇元大仙; lit. 'The Great Immortal Zhenyuan'), also known as Zhenyuanzi (Chinese: 镇元子), is a character from the 16th century Chinese novel Journey to the West and a Taoist deity who is the patriarch of all Earth's Immortals in Taoist pantheon. His residence is Wanshoushan Wuzhuang Guan, one of the only two officially listed Dongtianfudi in Journey to the West.

== Journey to the West ==
According to Journey to the West, Zhenyuan Daxian is based in Wuzhuang Temple (五莊觀) on Longevity Mountain (萬壽山) in Aparagodānīya. In his temple, there is a special Ginseng Fruit Tree (人參樹) that was formed when primeval chaos was first being divided, before the separation of Heaven and Earth. On the tree grows a Ginseng Fruit (人參果), also translated as "Manfruit" and otherwise called "Grass-returning Cinnabar" (草還丹). The tree produces 30 such fruits every 9,000 years, each ripe one shaped like an infant less than three days old. Just by smelling the fruit, a person can extend his lifespan by 360 years; a person who eats the fruit can live an additional 47,000 years. Zhenyuan and Tang Sanzang had been friends in Tang Sanzang's previous life as Golden Cicada (金蟬子), a disciple of the Buddha. Soon, upon the protagonists' arrival at his temple during their journey, he was invited by Yuanshi Tianzun to listen. However, he had instructed his servants Qingfeng (清風; literally "Clear Wind") and Mingyue (明月; literally "Bright Moon") to give two fruits to Tang Sanzang. Tang Sanzang is frightened when he sees that the fruit looks like a premature infant and refuses to eat it. Qingfeng and Mingyue eat the fruits themselves and are seen by Zhu Bajie. Sun Wukong, however, steals another three fruits for himself and his two juniors. When Qingfeng and Mingyue realize that some of the fruits are missing, they accuse Sun Wukong of theft and call the pilgrims names. Sun Wukong destroys the Ginseng fruit tree in anger and escapes with his companions. When Zhenyuan returns to his temple, he is furious after learning the truth from Qingfeng and Mingyue. He pursues the protagonists and captures them twice after they attempt to flee again. Later he agrees not to punish them if Sun Wukong can find a way to revive the tree.

Sun Wukong visited the Sanxing and many high deities in the heavenly court, but none of them knew how to revive the tree. Finally, he went to Guanyin and told her what had happened. Guanyin says,

"You have no conscience at all. That manfruit tree of his is the life-root from the time when Heaven and Earth were separated, and Great Immortal Zhenyuan is the Patriarch of the Earth's Immortals, which means even I have to show him a certain respect."

The conflict is eventually resolved when Guanyin helps them restore the Ginseng fruit tree back to life. Zhenyuan is so pleased that he gives up his desire for revenge and becomes sworn brothers with Sun Wukong. He treats all of them to a fruit feast before seeing them off on their journey.

== Character personality ==
According to the original Journey to the West, Zhenyuanzi is portrayed as a relatively gentle figure. When Sun Wukong damaged his precious Ginseng Fruit Tree, Zhenyuanzi did not retaliate immediately. Instead, he reasoned calmly with Tang Sanzang and his disciples. However, when Sun Wukong acted rudely and struck Zhenyuanzi, the immortal responded by capturing the entire group as punishment. Later, when Sun Wukong expressed his desire to restore the Ginseng Tree, Zhenyuanzi generously allowed him to choose as many days as he needed to accomplish the task.

However, in the Journey to the West (1986 TV series), Zhenyuanzi’s character was significantly altered—he was portrayed as rather fierce. When Sun Wukong damaged his precious Ginseng Fruit Tree, Zhenyuanzi didn’t say much and immediately captured the entire Tang monk’s group. He then punished them severely. Later, when Sun Wukong wanted to heal the Ginseng Tree, Zhenyuanzi gave him only three days to find a cure.

== Character evaluation ==
According to the descriptions in the novel,then according to Qingfeng and Mingyue, Zhenyuan Daxian is the great god who interacts with the Three Pure Ones, indicating his incredibly esteemed status. A couplet hung outside his Daoist temple reads, "Longevity like the immortals, a household with the same lifespan as heaven," suggesting an extraordinary level of longevity. Sun Wukong, who has seen much of the world, naturally finds this claim hard to believe, saying, "Five hundred years ago, when I caused a ruckus in the Heavenly Palace, I never heard such words at Laozi's gate." Furthermore, Wuzhuang Temple doesn't venerate the Three Pure Ones, the Four Sovereigns, or other celestial authorities; they only offer incense to "heaven and earth". According to the two attendants, Qingfeng and Mingyue, only one word, "heaven," deserves the incense of Zhenyuan Daxian, while the word "earth" isn't worthy. Additionally, Zhenyuan Daxian refers to the Three Pure Ones as his friends, the Four Sovereigns as acquaintances, Jiuyao (九曜, nine heavenly deities) as juniors, and the Origin Stars (元辰) as guests. This leads to questions about the true identity of Zhenyuan Daxian.

However, later on, some people discovered that the words of the two attendants, Qingfeng and Mingyue, were merely flattery. In the original Journey to the West, there is a passage where Zhenyuanzi himself admits that he studied the Dao under the command of Yuanshi Tianzun. This clearly shows that he is still subordinate to the Three Pure Ones and not on equal footing with them. Moreover, in Journey to the West, the Three Pure Ones often obey the orders of the Jade Emperor, who is one of the Four Sovereigns. Therefore, there is no way that Zhenyuanzi could be on the same level as them. However, in the Journey to the West (1986 TV series) and in later adaptations, the detail in which Zhenyuanzi admits to having received Daoist teachings under the command of Yuanshi Tianzun is omitted. This omission has led to many misunderstandings and speculations about his true status.

Qing dynasty Daoist hermit Wang Xiangxu stated: "Within the sleeves of Zhenyuan Daxian, the universe resides, vast and capable of encompassing all beings. Yet, it cannot capture those who move freely. Even if it could, they would escape, and if captured again, they would break free once more, just as if never ensnared. The universe may be immense, but the heart within is even greater. With this heart, one can transcend the boundaries of the universe. Although referred to as puppets, who among them truly controls whom?".
