= Martin Jetter =

Martin Jetter (born 1959 in Germany), is a computer engineer and businessman. He studied at University of Stuttgart and received a master's degree in mechanical engineering from the same university.

== Career ==
Jetter started to work for IBM Deutschland GmbH as an application engineer in 1986. He became a manager of the industrial sector of IBM Central Europe in 1999, and a director in charge of Siemens Group in 2001. He was promoted to CEO of IBM Deutschland in 2006, and an IBM Corporate Director of Strategy in 2011. In 2012, he became CEO of IBM Japan, Ltd.

In January 2015, he became the senior vice president of IBM Global Technology Services.

In February 2019, he became the senior vice president and chairman of IBM Europe.
