= Jetta International =

- Company type: Private
- Industry: Electronics
- Founded: 1991
- Headquarters: Monmouth Junction, New Jersey, United States
- Area served: East Coast of the United States
- Products: Notebooks
- Website: www.jettaus.com, Now Defunct

Jetta International was an American original equipment manufacturer (OEM) and designer of computer laptops, mainly operating in the East Coast. The company was established in 1991, and was based in Monmouth Junction, New Jersey, (close to Princeton), where its only manufacturing plant is located.

Jetbook, the laptop series manufactured by Jetta, had Intel microprocessors and was supplied with a customizable selection of software. Jetbooks were known in the open source community due to their ability to be purchased without a pre-installed operating system.
