= Jetavana =

Buddhist monastery in Uttar Pradesh, India

Translations of Jetavana
- English: Jeta's grove
- Sanskrit: 𑖕𑖸𑖝𑖪𑖡𑖸𑖡𑖯𑖞𑖢𑖰𑖜𑖿𑖚𑖟𑖭𑖿𑖧𑖯𑖨𑖯𑖦𑖾 (IAST: Jetavana anāthapiṇḍadārāma)
- Bengali: জেতবন
- Burmese: ဇေတဝန်ကျောင်းတော်
- Chinese: 祇園精舍/祇园精舍 (Pinyin: Qíyuánjīngshè)
- Indonesian: Jetavana
- Japanese: 祇園精舎 (Rōmaji: Gionshōjya)
- Korean: 기원정사(祇園精舎) (RR: Giwonjeongsa)
- Tamil: ஜேதவனம்
- Thai: วัดเชตวัน
- Vietnamese: Kì Viên Tinh Xá

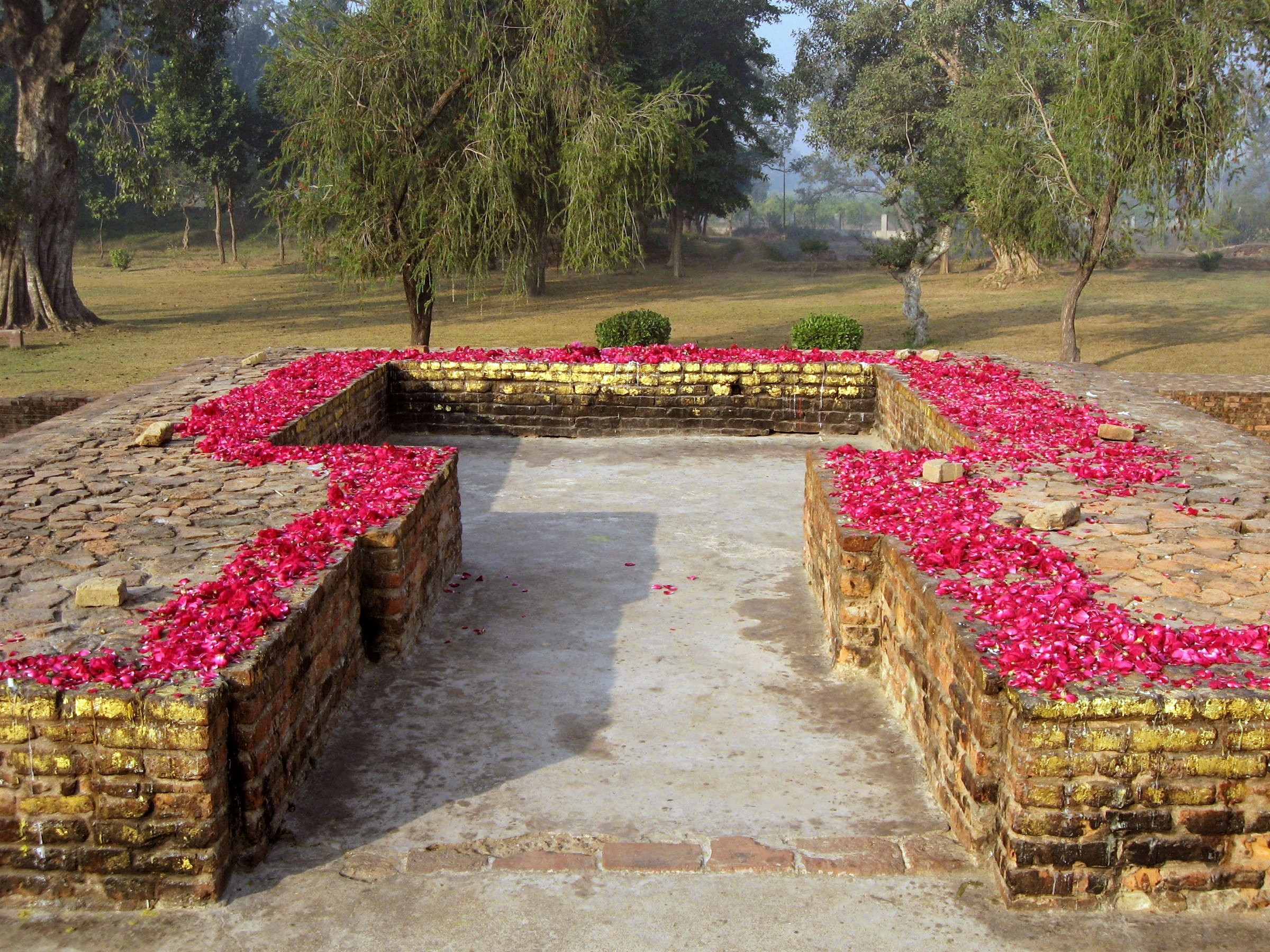
Mulagandhakuti. The remains of the Buddha's hut at Jetavana.

Jetavana (lit. 'Jeta's grove') or Jethavanārāma (lit. 'Jetavana Monastery') was one of the most famous of the vihāras (Buddhist monasteries) in what is now Uttar Pradesh, India. It was the second vihāra donated to the Buddha after the Venuvana in Rajgir. The monastery was given to him by his chief male patron, Anathapindika.

Jetavana is located just outside the old city of Savatthi. There was also an important vihāra named Jetavana in Sri Lanka; the stupa of Jetavanaramaya is all that remains today.

Jetavana was the place where the Buddha gave the majority of his teachings and discourses, having stayed at Jetavana nineteen out of 45 vassas (monsoon retreats), more than in any other vihāra. It is said that after the Migāramātupāsāda, a second vihara erected at Pubbarama close to Savatthi was built by the Buddha's chief female lay disciple, Visakha, the Buddha would dwell alternately between Jetavana and Migāramātupāsāda, often spending the day in one and the night in the other (SNA.i.336).

== Donation of Jetavana ==
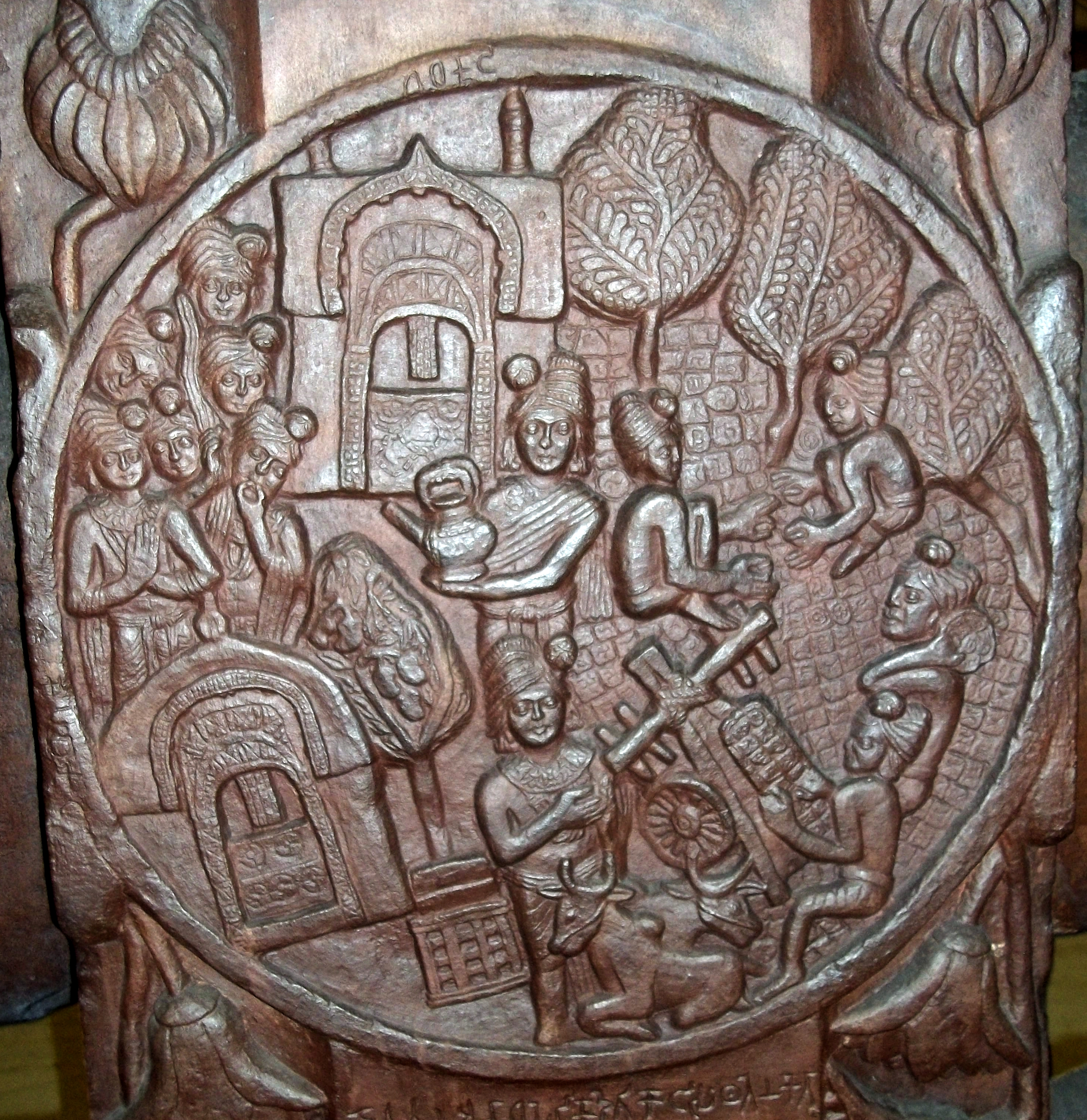
Anathapindika covers Jetavana with coins (Bharhut)

Following Anathapindika's first encounter with the Buddha, he requested to offer him a meal, which the Buddha accepted, and then asked to build a temple for him and his monks in his hometown of Savatthi, to which the Buddha agreed.

Shortly after, Anathapindika went back to Savatthi to search for a place to build the monastery. Looking for a place that was both accessible to followers and peacefully secluded, he came across a park belonging to Prince Jeta, the son of King Pasenadi of Kosala. Anathapindika offered to buy the park from the prince but the prince refused, after Anathapindika persisted, the prince jokingly said he will sell him the park if he covers it with gold coins, to which Anathapindika agreed.

Anathapindika later came back with wagons full of gold pieces to cover the park with. When Prince Jeta stated that he was merely joking and still would not sell the park, Anathapindika and the prince went to arbitrators who concluded that Prince Jeta had to sell the park at the mentioned price.

The money brought in the first journey was found insufficient to cover one small spot near the gateway. So Anāthapindika sent his servants back for more, but Jeta, inspired by Anāthapindika's earnestness, asked to be allowed to give this spot. Anāthapindika agreed and Jeta erected there a gateway, with a room over it. Anāthapindika built in the grounds dwelling rooms, retiring rooms, store rooms and service halls, halls with fireplaces, closets, cloisters, halls for exercise, wells, bathrooms, ponds, open and roofed sheds, etc. (Vin.ii.158f).

It is said (MA.i.50; UdA.56f) that Anāthapindika paid eighteen crores for the purchase of the site, all of which Jeta spent in the construction of the gateway gifted by him. (The gateway was evidently an imposing structure; see J.ii.216).

Jeta gave, besides, many valuable trees for timber. Anāthapindika himself spent fifty-four crores in connection with the purchase of the park and the buildings erected in it.

The ceremony of dedication was one of great splendour. Not only Anāthapindika himself, but his whole family took part: his son with five hundred other youths, his wife with five hundred other noble women, and his daughters Mahā Subhaddā and Cūla Subhaddā with five hundred other maidens. Anāthapindika was attended by five hundred bankers. The festivities in connection with the dedication lasted for nine months (J.i.92ff).

The vihāra is almost always referred to as Jetavane Anāthapindikassa ārāma (Pali, meaning: in Jeta Grove, Anathapindika's Monastery). The Commentaries (MA.ii.50; UdA.56f, etc.) say that this was deliberate (at the Buddha's own suggestion pp. 81–131; Beal: op. cit., ii.5 and Rockhill: p. 49), in order that the names of both earlier and later owners might be recorded and that people might be reminded of two men, both very generous in the cause of the Religion, so that others might follow their example. The vihāra is sometimes referred to as Jetārāma (E.g., Ap.i.400).

== Description of ancient Jetavana ==
=== Inside Jetavana ===
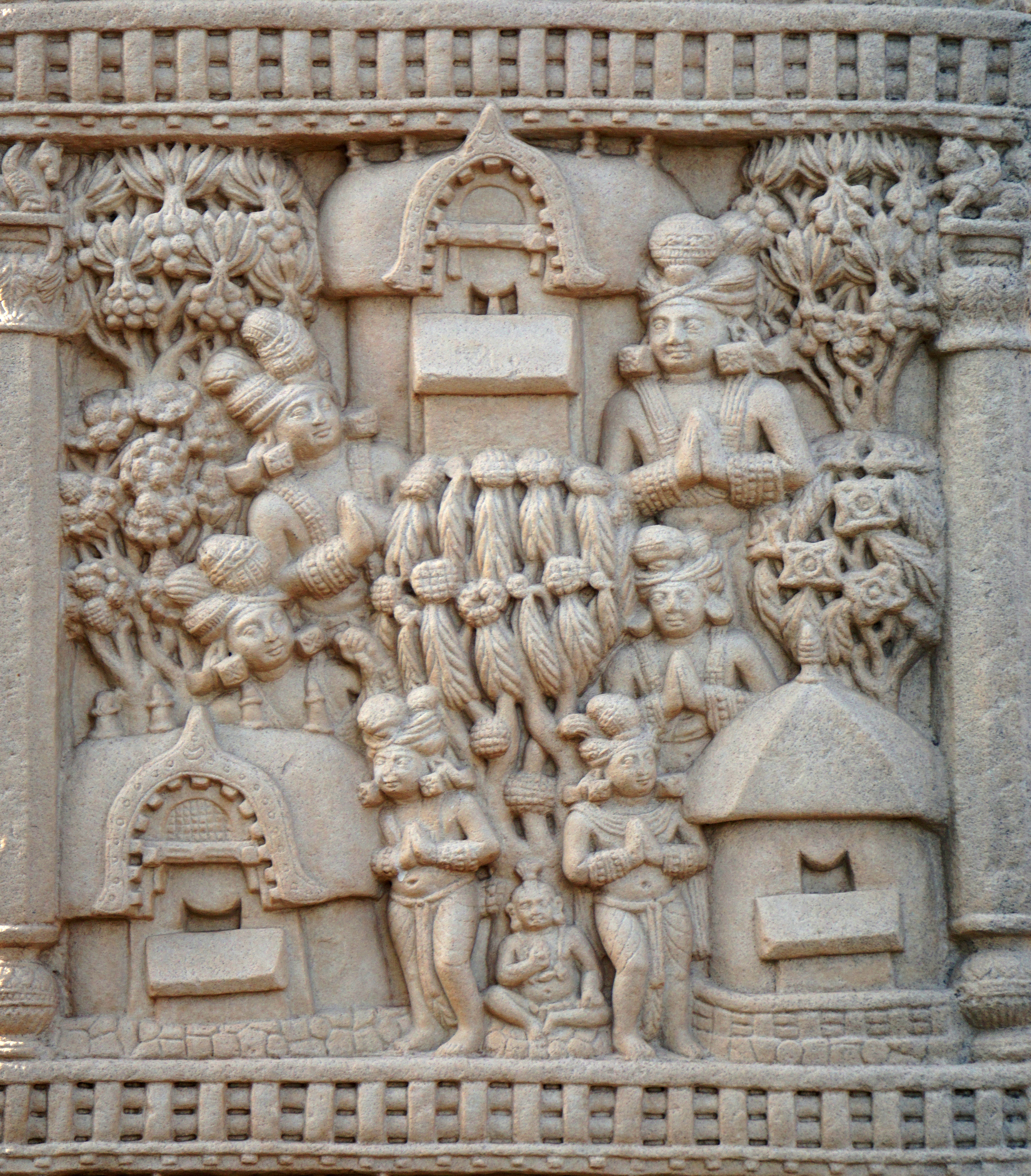
Jetavana of Sravasti, showing the three preferred residences of the Buddha. Sanchi.

Map

Some of the chief buildings attached to the Jetavana are mentioned in the books by special names, viz., Mahāgandhakuti, Kaverimandalamāla, Kosambakuti and Candanamāla. SNA.ii.403. Other buildings are also mentioned - e.g., the Ambalakotthaka-āsanasālā (J.ii.246). According to Tibetan sources the vihāra was built according to a plan sent by the devas of Tusita and contained sixty large halls and sixty small. The Vinaya-piṭaka (Dulwa in Tibetan) also gives details of the decorative scheme of the vihāra (Rockhill: op. cit.48 and n.2).

All these were built by Anāthapindika; there was another large building erected by Pasenadi and called the Salalaghara (DA.ii.407). Over the gateway lived a guardian deity to prevent all evildoers from entering (SA.i.239). Just outside the monastery was a rājāyatana tree, the residence of the god Samiddhisumana (Mhv.i.52f; MT 105; but see DhA.i.41, where the guardian of the gateway is called Sumana).

In the grounds there seems to have been a large pond which came to be called the Jetavanapokkharanī. (AA.i.264; here the Buddha often bathed (J.i.329ff.). Is this the Pubbakotthaka referred to at A.iii.345? But see S.v.220; it was near this pond that Devadatta was swallowed up in Avīci (J.iv.158)).

The grounds themselves were thickly covered with trees, giving the appearance of a wooded grove (arañña) (Sp.iii.532). On the outskirts of the monastery was a mango-grove (J.iii.137). In front of the gateway was the Bodhi-tree planted by Anāthapindika, which came later to be called the Anandabodhi (J.iv.228f). Not far from the gateway was a cave which became famous as the Kapallapūvapabbhāra on account of an incident connected with Macchariyakosiya (J.i.348).

According to the Divyāvadāna (Dvy.395f), the thūpas of Sāriputta and Moggallāna were in the grounds of Jetavana and existed until the time of Asoka. Both Fa Hien (Giles: p. 33ff) and Houien Thsang (Beal.ii.7ff) give descriptions of other incidents connected with the Buddha, which took place in the neighbourhood of Jetavana - e.g., the murder of Sundarikā, the calumny of Ciñcā, Devadatta's attempt to poison the Buddha, etc.

=== The Gandhakuti: Buddha's dwelling in Jetavana ===
The space covered by the four bedposts of the Buddha's Gandhakuti in Jetavana is one of the four avijahitatthānāni; all Buddhas possess the same, though the size of the actual vihāra differs in the case of the various Buddhas. For Vipassī Buddha, the setthi Punabbasumitta built a monastery extending for a whole league, while for Sikhī Buddha, the setthi Sirivaddha made one covering three gavutas. The Sanghārāma built by Sotthiya for Vessabhū Buddha was half a league in extent, while that erected by Accuta for Kakusandha Buddha covered only one gāvuta. The monastery of the Koṇāgamana Buddha, built by the setthi Ugga, extended for half a gāvuta, while that of the Kassapa Buddha built by Sumangala covered sixteen karīsas. Anāthapindika's monastery covered a space of eighteen karīsas (BuA.2, 47; J.i.94; DA.ii.424).

According to a description given by Faxian (Giles, pp. 31, 33), the vihāra was originally in seven sections (storeys?) and was filled with all kinds of offerings, embroidered banners, canopies, etc., and the lamps burnt from dusk to dawn.

One day a rat, holding in its mouth a lamp wick, set fire to the banners and canopies, and all the seven sections were entirely destroyed. The vihāra was later rebuilt in two sections. There were two main entrances, one on the east, one on the west, and Faxian found thūpas erected at all the places connected with the Buddha, each with its name inscribed.

=== Near Jetavana ===
Near Jetavana was evidently a monastery of rival teachers where Ciñcāmānavikā spent her nights as she was hatching her paternity-fraud smear campaign against the Buddha.

There seems to have been a playground just outside Jetavana used by the children of the neighbourhood, who, when thirsty, would go into Jetavana to drink (DhA.iii.492). The high road to Sāvatthi passed by the edge of Jetavana, and travellers would enter the park to rest and refresh themselves.

== Later history ==
The Jetavana vihara was apparently active as late as 1128/29 CE (1186 VS), when an inscription (discovered by Daya Ram Sahni in 1908 in one of the ruined monastery structures at Shravasti) recorded the re-affirming or renewing of a grant by the Gahadavala king Govindachandra to "the most respected sangha of bhikkus, of whom Buddhabhattāraka is the chief, residing in the convent of the Holy Jetavana". The grant included six villages along with their lands. It may have somehow lapsed earlier, or it may have been that Govindachandra was simply re-confirming it.

== Discovery and current situation ==
The remains of Jetavana and Savatthi were locally known as Sahet-Mahet. Alexander Cunningham used the ancient (6th century AD) accounts of Chinese pilgrim-monks to determine that Sahet-Mahet actually referred to Jetavana and Savatthi.

Jetavana is currently a historical park, with remains of many ancient buildings such as monasteries, huts (such as the Gandhakuti and the Kosambakuti) and stupas. In Jetavana is also located the second-holiest tree of Buddhism: the Anandabodhi Tree. A visit to Savatthi and Jetavana is part of the Buddhist pilgrim route in North-India. The most revered place in Jetavana is the Gandhakuti, where Buddha used to stay. Jetavana is located at 27°30′34″N 82°02′24″E.

== Legacy ==
In Japan the deity Gozu Tenno is considered to have originated as a guardian of Jetavana. He is a central deity of the Gion faith and identified with Susanoo-no-Mikoto. The district Gion where the faith is centered is the Japanese translation (via Chinese Qiyuan) of the Buddhist term Jetavana.

== Photo gallery ==
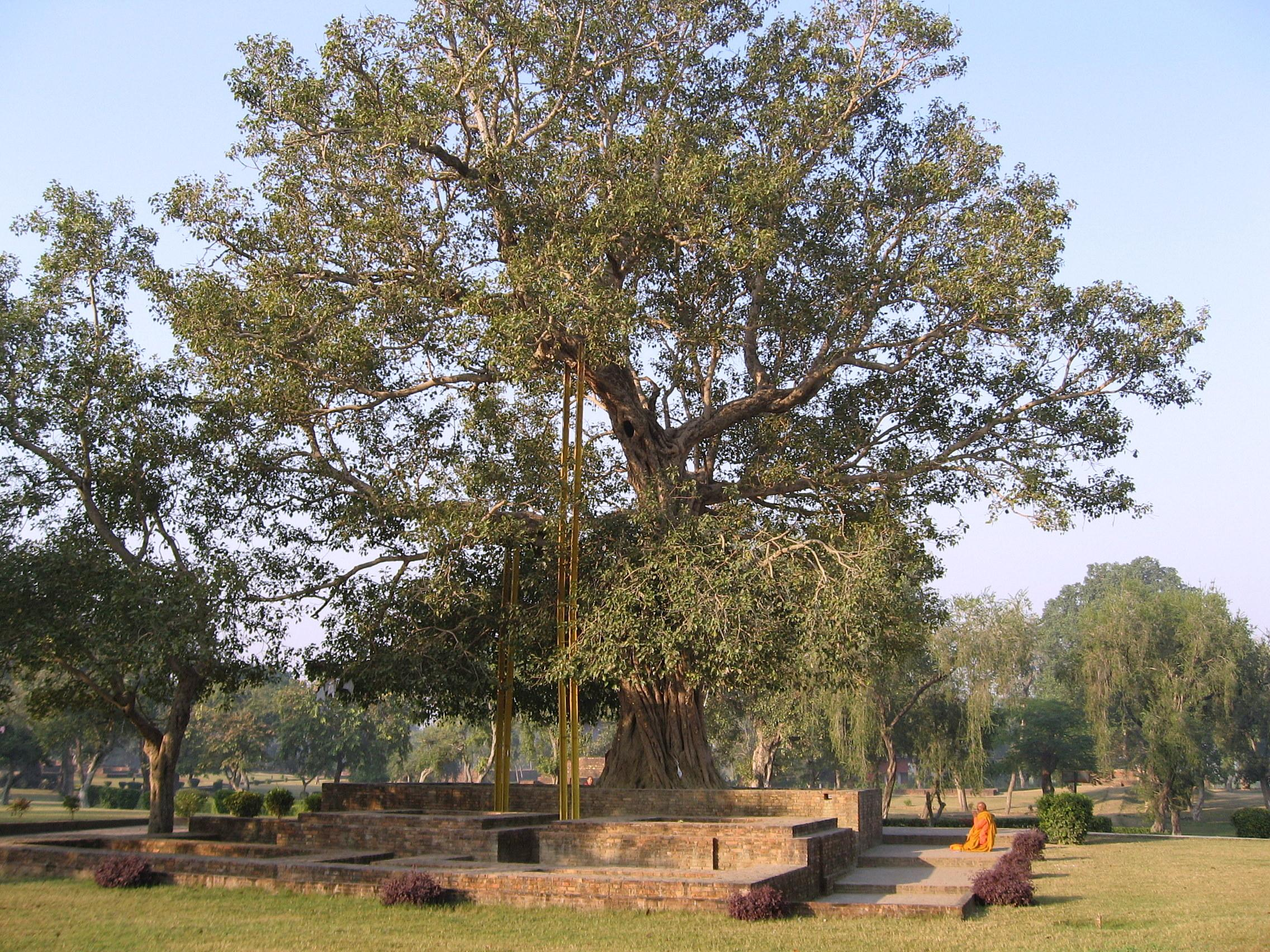
Anandabodhi tree in Jetavana monastery

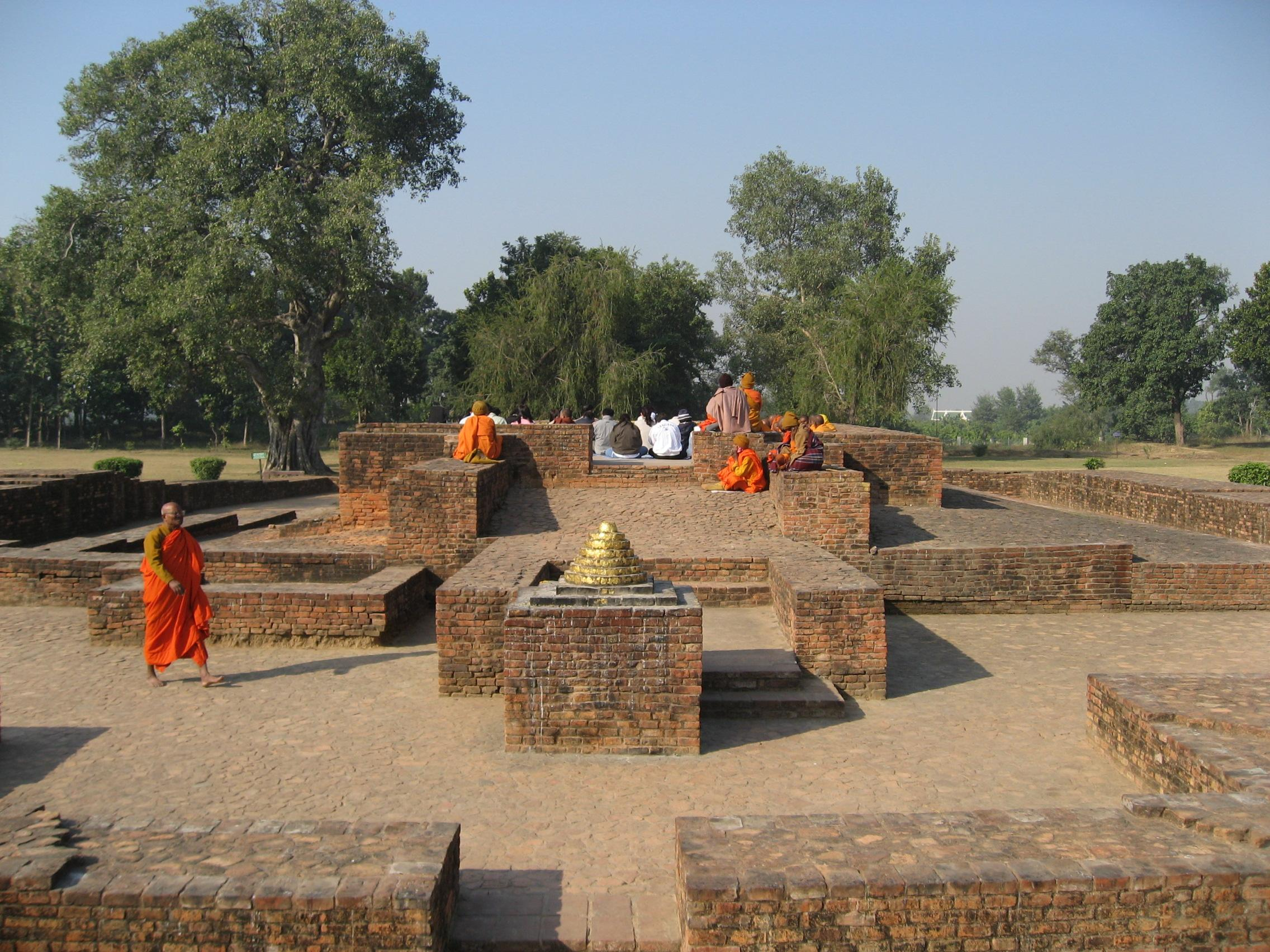
Gandhakuti (Buddha's hut) in Jetavana

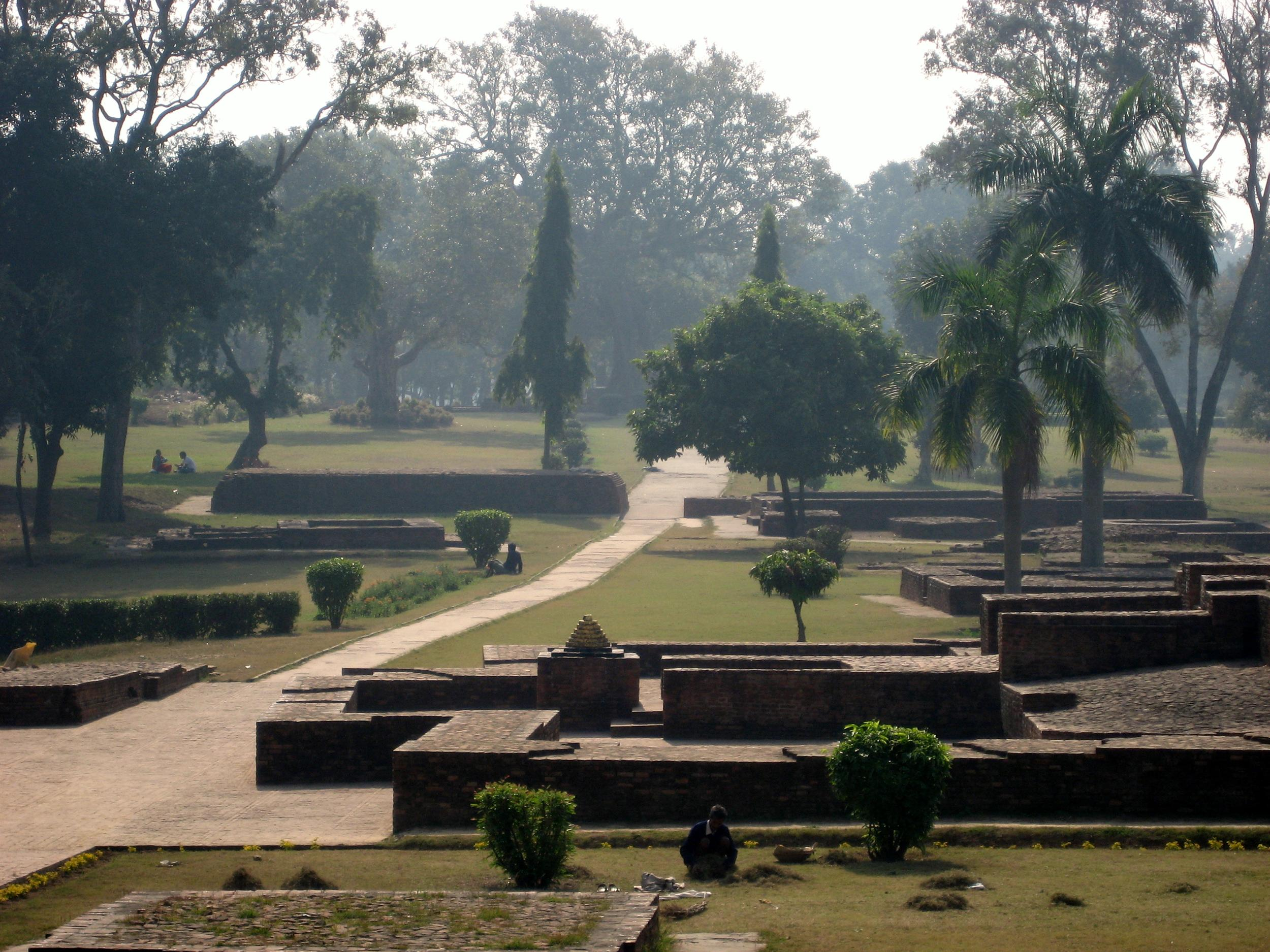
Scene in Jetavana

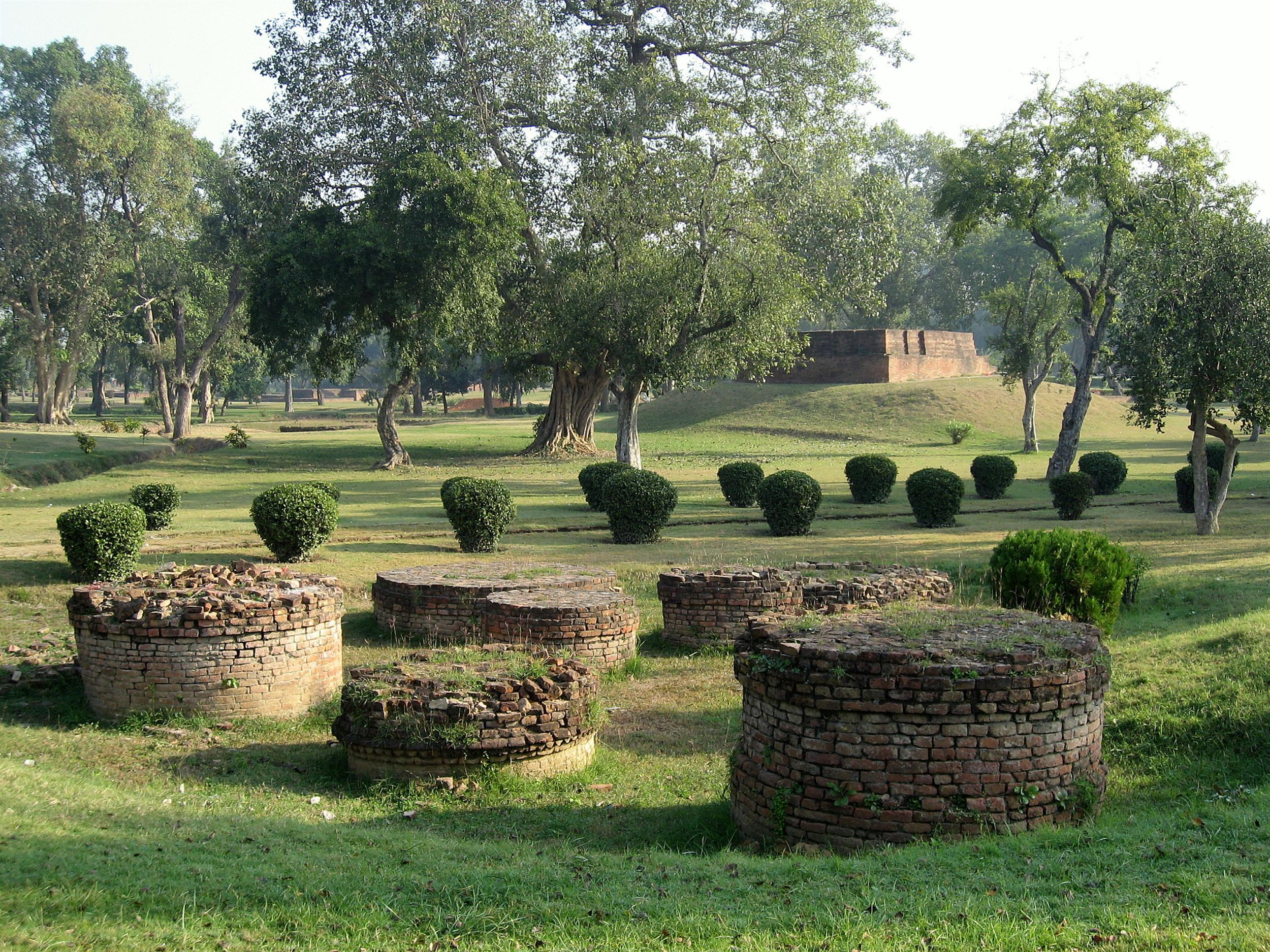
Scene in Jetavana, showing some small stupas

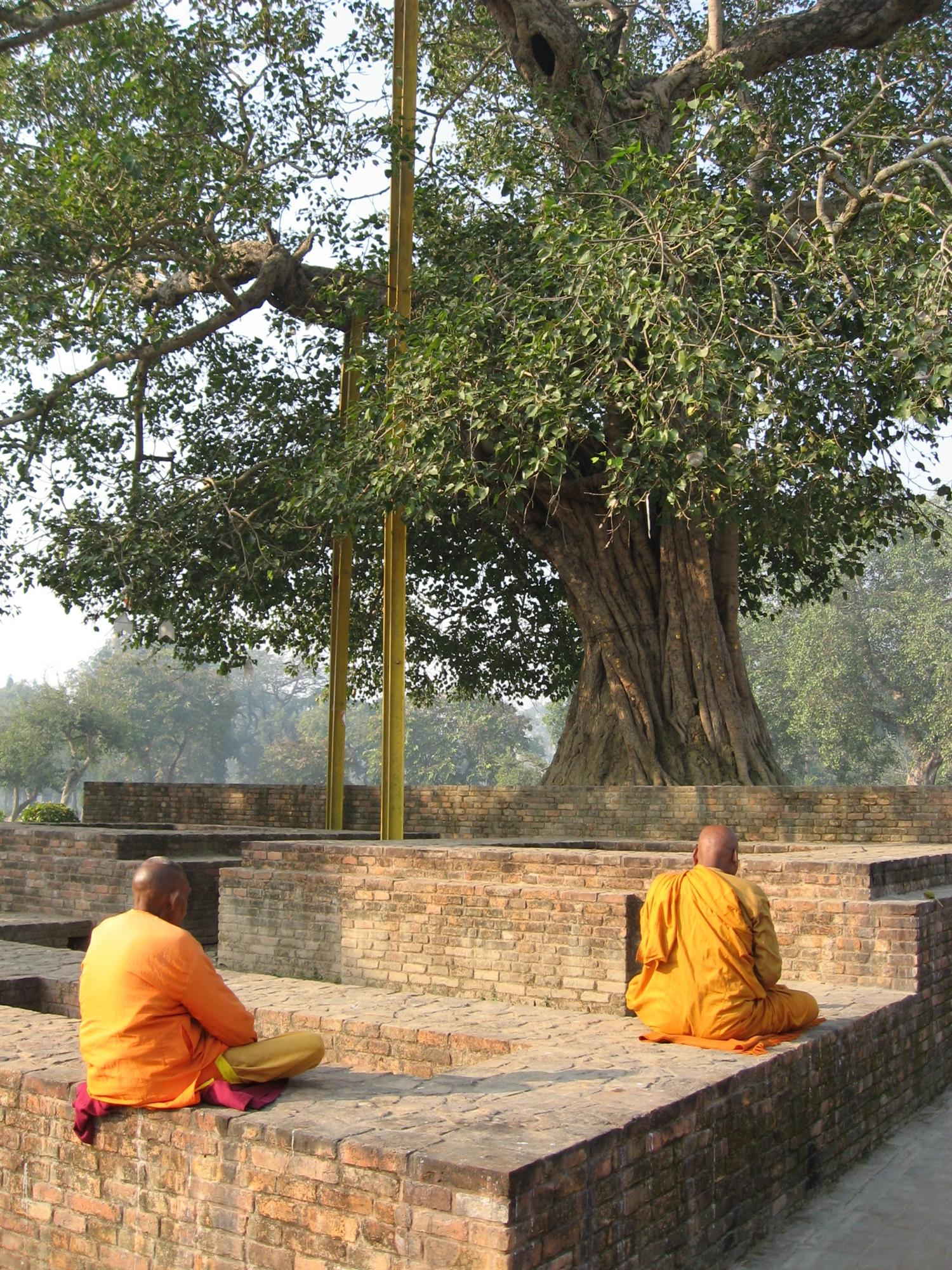
Buddhist monks meditating under the Anandabodhi tree

== See also ==
- Anathapindika
- Kassapa Buddha
- Koṇāgamana Buddha
- Kakusandha Buddha
- List of the twenty-eight Buddhas
- Gion
