= Jeter =

Jeter is a surname. Notable people with this surname include:

== Sports ==
=== Baseball ===
- Derek Jeter (born 1974), American baseball player
- Johnny Jeter (baseball) (born 1944), American baseball player
- Shawn Jeter (born 1966), American baseball player

=== Basketball ===
- Eugene Jeter (born 1983), American basketball player
- Hal Jeter (born 1945), American basketball player
- Rob Jeter (born 1969), American basketball coach, son of Bob Jeter

=== American football ===
- Bob Jeter (1937–2008), American football player
- Donovan Jeter (born 1998), American football player
- Gary Jeter (1955–2016), American football player
- Tony Jeter (born 1944), American football player

=== Other ===
- Carmelita Jeter (born 1979), American sprinter
- Johnny Jeter (born 1981), American professional wrestler

== Other ==
- Chris Jeter, American attorney and politician in Indiana
- Claude Jeter (1914–2009), American gospel singer
- Hannah Jeter (born 1990), American model and television host
- Henry N. Jeter (1851–1938), American Baptist minister
- Howard Jeter (born 1947), retired American diplomat
- James Jeter (1921–2007), American film, stage and television actor
- K. W. Jeter (born 1950), American author
- Michael Jeter (1952–2003), American actor
- William T. Jeter (1850–1930), American politician, 21st Lieutenant Governor of California

== Fictional characters ==
- Tom Jeter, fictional character on Studio 60 on the Sunset Strip

== See also ==
- Jeder, Hungarian name of a village in Romania
- Jeter Downs (born 1998), Colombian-American baseball player
- Jever, a city in Lower Saxony, Germany
  - Jever Brewery, located in Jever
