= Padumuttara Buddha =

Thirteenth of twenty-eight Buddhas

- Sanskrit: पद्मोत्तर; Padmottara
- Pāli: Padumuttara
- Burmese: ပဒုမုတ္တရဘုရား
- Chinese: 蓮花上佛 (Pinyin: Liánhuāshàng Fó)
- Khmer: ព្រះពុទ្ធ បទុមុត្តរា
- Korean: 연화상불 (RR: Yeonhwasang Bul)
- Sinhala: පදුමුත්තර බුදුන් වහන්සේ Padumuththara Budun Wahanse
- Thai: พระปทุมุตรพุทธเจ้า; Phra Patumutar Phutthachao
- Vietnamese: Thắng Liên Hoa Phật; Thượng Liên Hoa Phật; Bạch Liên Hoa Phật

Information
- Venerated by: Theravada, Mahayana, Vajrayana
- Attributes: Producing Lotus

According to the Buddhavaṃsa of the Pali Canon, Padumuttara or Padumuttara Buddha is the thirteenth of the twenty-nine buddhas who preceded the historical Gautama Buddha.

In the Buddhavamsa, he is described as:

One hundred thousand aeons ago, Padumuttara Buddha, who knows everything and deserves every donations, was born alone in that aeon.

== Biography ==
He was born in Hamsavatī. He lived for ten thousand years in three palaces: Naravāhana, Yassa (or Yasavatī) and Vasavatti. His wife was Vasudattā, by whom he had a son, Uttara. His body was fifty-eight cubits (around 26.5 metres (87 ft)) high.

He practiced asceticism for seven days. He died in Nandārāma at the age of one hundred thousand, and a stūpa twelve leagues in height was erected over his relics.

His life parallels that of Gautama Buddha except that he was assisted by different people and his bodhi tree was a sarala (Dipterocarpus zeylanicus) in Theravada buddhism. Many of Gautama Buddha's disciples were said to have made their aspiration for eminent positions in the time of Padumuttara.

In the Apadāna some gods wish to build a stūpa of their own over the relics of Padumuttara. As a Tathāgata, his relics were not separated. Dīpankara attained Nirvāṇa in Nandārāma, where a stūpa was built which was thirty-six yojanas high.

== The Buddha and the Lotus ==
According to the Buddhavamsa, a sacred lotus appears wherever the foot of Padumuttara lands. The lotuses had a length of 90 cubits or 135 feet and a breadth of 60 cubits or 90 feet. The stamens were 30 cubits or 45 feet and the petals were 12 cubits or 18 feet. When his right foot lands, 2.25 quarts of pollen were produced. When he took another step, the previous lotus disappeared and a new one appeared.

== See also ==
- List of the twenty-eight Buddhas
