= Interim =

Interim may refer to:

== Temporary organizational arrangements (general concept) ==
- Interim leader, a temporary leader of a political party in Canada
- Provisional government, emergency government during the creation, collapse, or crisis of a state; also called interim government
- Caretaker government, temporary rule between governments in a parliamentary democracy; also called interim government
- Acting president, interim head of a state
- Acting (law), designation of a person temporarily exercising the authority of any position
- Interim management, in business
- Regent, temporary ruler standing in for monarch currently unable to exercise rule
- Locum, a person who temporarily fulfills the duties of another

== Legal concepts and procedures ==
- Interim order, court order in effect pending outcome of a case
- Interim trustee, concept in United States bankruptcy law
- Interim appeal, a partial appeal in United States law
- Interim interdict in Scots law, a temporary injunction
- Judicial interim release, part of Canadian bail law

== Temporary peaces ==
- Regensburg Interim, 1542 decree relating to religious disputes in Germany
- Augsburg Interim, 1548 decree relating to religious disputes in Germany
- Leipzig Interim, another 1548 decree relating to religious disputes in Germany
- Interim Peace between Finland and the USSR 1940–1941

== Sports ==
- Caretaker manager, temporary manager of a soccer team; also called interim manager
- Interim championship, temporary world championship in boxing and other contact sports
- IFA Interim Intermediate League, Ireland 2008–2009

== Arts ==
- Interim (film), 1953 short film by Stan Brakhage
- Interim (album), 2004 album by British rock band The Fall
- INTERIM-Theater in Munich

== Other ==
- MCC Interim Linux, provisional software release 1992
- Interim Control Module, NASA machine
- Interim (journal), a journal published by the York Archaeological Trust

== See also ==
- Intermediate state (disambiguation)
