= Intermediate state =

Intermediate state may refer to:

== Science ==
- an intermediate chemical state
- Virtual state, a very short-lived, unobservable quantum state
- Meissner effect, the expulsion of a magnetic field from a superconductor during its transition to the superconducting state
- Mesophase, is a state of matter between solid and liquid

== Religion ==
- Intermediate state (Christianity), a person's existence between death and the universal resurrection, in some forms of Christianity
- Bardo, an intermediate state between death and rebirth in some schools of Buddhism
- Gandharva, in Buddhism, being in the intermediate state between death and rebirth
- Al A'raf, an intermediate state in Islam between Heaven and Hell for those who are balanced in their good works and sins
- Barzakh, in Islam, a phase between an individual's death and their resurrection
- Purgatory, an intermediate state after physical death for expiatory purification, in some Christian denominations and Islam

== See also ==
- Afterlife, or life after death, in various religious traditions and myths
- Last Judgment, or Day of Reckoning, Doomsday, or Day of Resurrection, in Abrahamic religions and Zoroastrianism
- Limbo, the afterlife condition of those who die in original sin without being assigned to hell, in Catholic theology
- Merit (Buddhism), a concept considered fundamental to Buddhist ethics
- Mesoscopic physics, a subdiscipline of condensed matter physics that deals with materials of an intermediate size
- Population inversion, in statistical mechanics
- Quantum superposition, a fundamental principle of quantum mechanics.
- Undead, beings in mythology, legend, or fiction that are deceased but behave as if alive
- Vegetative state, a disorder of consciousness
