= Acting (law) =

Carrying out a role on an interim basis

In law, a person is acting in a position if they are not serving in the position on a permanent basis. This may be the case if the position has not yet been formally created, the person is occupying the position only on an interim basis, the person lacks a mandate, or the person meant to fill the role is incompetent or incapacitated.

== Business ==
Organizations are advised to have a succession plan, including the designation of an acting CEO if the person in that job vacates the position before a replacement has been determined. For example, the lead director on the board of directors may be designated to assume the CEO's responsibilities until the board finds a new CEO.

== Politics ==
Examples of acting positions in politics include acting mayor, acting governor, acting president, and acting prime minister. Officials in an acting position sometimes lack the full powers of a properly appointed official and are often the proper official's deputy or longest-serving subordinate. Being placed in an acting position is a good indicator that the acting person has the confidence of their superiors or colleagues and is likely to be chosen for the position permanently.

== Legal frameworks ==
=== Commonwealth ===
In Commonwealth countries including Australia and Canada, the Carltona doctrine is the overarching legal principle governing when a minister may be said to be acting for or on behalf of a government department.

=== United States ===
The 1910 edition of Black's Law Dictionary defines "acting" as a "term employed to designate a locum tenens who is performing the duties of an office to which he does not himself claim title". The 1914 edition of Corpus Juris Secundum gives much the same account.

Fraser v. United States, the first case cited in the Black's entry on "acting", concerns James G. Hill, the Supervising Architect of the Treasury. Hill had been suspended with pay while being investigated for a charge of fraud. Another person, John Fraser, was then directed by the Secretary of the Treasury to take charge of and perform the duties of Hill's office as "Acting" Supervising Architect. Officially, Fraser was merely a contractor who had been contracted to oversee the construction of a building for the Bureau of Engraving and Printing. When Hill was returned to his position some five and a half months later, Fraser sought to be compensated for the time he had worked as Acting Supervising Architect, seeking the difference between the salary for that office and his much lower pay as a contracting architect for the Treasury. The Court of Claims found that the "acting" position was not a statutory creation, and that Fraser was entitled to no pay beyond that of his contract for the period.

The rules for appointment of acting officials are covered in many cases by the Federal Vacancies Reform Act of 1998 (FVRA). Legal scholar Anne Joseph O'Connell notes that one central—and unresolved—question about the nature of acting officials under FVRA is their status under the Appointments Clause of the Constitution of the United States. O'Connell observes that portions of FVRA, an act of Congress which sets out a detailed scheme for filling vacant positions in federal agencies, may be unconstitutional if acting officials can be "principal" officers under the Appointments Clause. The constitutional issue emerges because the Appointments Clause requires principal officers to be appointed by the President with the advice and consent of the Senate. If acting officers who take office pursuant to FVRA—not pursuant to presidential nomination and Senate confirmation—can be considered principal officers, then the FVRA would be unconstitutional to the extent that it allows this to occur. Heilpern, for his part, argues that acting Cabinet-level officials are principal officers.

=== South Korea ===
In South Korea, an acting officeholder is considered to be subject to the impeachment rules of the office they formally hold, not the office they act in. This principle was established as part of the Impeachment of Han Duck-soo, who was prime minister and acting president; the South Korean National Assembly voted to impeach Han with 194 votes in favor, which meets the absolute majority requirement applicable for prime ministerial impeachments but not the two-thirds supermajority requirement applicable for presidential impeachments; the Constitutional Court ruled that the impeachment under the less restrictive rules is valid.

== See also ==
- Interim (disambiguation)
- Regent

== Sources ==
- Heilpern, James A. (2019). "Acting Officers" (PDF). George Mason Law Review. 27 (1): 263–306. Archived from the original (PDF) on 20 July 2020.
- Malkin, Alissa (2008). "Government Reorganization and the Transfer of Powers: Does Certainty Matter?". Ottawa Law Review. 39 (3): 537–570. SSRN 2714178.
- McMillan, John (7 November 2000). "Parliament and Administrative Law". Research Paper 13 2000-01. Parliament of Australia.
- O'Connell, Anne Joseph (2020). "Actings". Columbia Law Review. 120 (3): 613–728. ISSN 0010-1958. JSTOR 26910475.
