= United States Trustee Program =

Division of the Department of Justice

The United States Trustee Program is a component of the United States Department of Justice that is responsible for overseeing the administration of bankruptcy cases and private trustees. The applicable federal law is found at 28 U.S.C. § 586 and 11 U.S.C. § 101, et seq.

In addition to the 21 United States Trustees, the program is administered by the Executive Office for U.S. Trustees (EOUST), located in Washington, D.C., and 82 field offices. The United States Trustee is the federal official charged with enforcing civil bankruptcy laws in the United States.

== Overview ==
The United States Attorney General generally appoints a separate United States Trustee for each of 21 geographical regions for a five-year term. Each United States Trustee is removable from office by and works under the general supervision of the Attorney General (see 28 U.S.C. § 581 and 28 U.S.C. § 586(c)). Each United States Trustee, an officer of the Department of Justice, is responsible for maintaining and supervising a panel of private trustees for Chapter 7 bankruptcy cases (see 28 U.S.C. § 586(a)(1)). The United States Trustee has other duties including the oversight of administration of most bankruptcy cases and trustees (see generally 28 U.S.C. § 586(a)(3)).

Each of the 21 regional U.S. Trustees maintains an office in each judicial district within the trustee's region, except for Alabama and North Carolina, which are not administered by the U.S. Trustee program, but utilize what is called the bankruptcy administrator, performing a similar function to the U.S. Trustee.

The U.S. Trustee does not have prosecution powers, but is required by law to refer information regarding potential criminal violations of bankruptcy laws to the United States Attorney.

Interim trustees serve by the U.S. Trustee's appointment in Chapter 7 cases. Generally the interim trustee is assigned at random from a "panel" of qualified individuals at the time a bankruptcy case is filed, and is automatically appointed as the "permanent" case trustee after the first meeting of creditors.

Due to the relative infrequency of filing of petitions for Chapter 12 (family farmer debt adjustment) relief, trustees for these cases are typically appointed on an ad hoc basis.

Each judicial district has one or more Standing Chapter 13 Trustees. The Standing Trustees are responsible for the administration of all Chapter 13 cases filed in their judicial district.

If for any reason all panel and/or standing trustees are disqualified or unable to perform, the U.S. Trustee may serve as trustee for a particular case under Chapter 7, 12 or 13. This very rarely happens.

The U.S. Trustee's office conducts the first meeting of creditors in a Chapter 11 case. Most Chapter 11's do not require the appointment of a trustee: however, in those cases which do, the U.S. Trustee oversees the appointed trustee's handling of the case and, for good cause, can seek the removal or replacement of the trustee. The U.S. Trustee may not, however, serve as the case trustee in Chapter 11. Along with the creditors committees, the U.S. Trustee acts as the primary "watchdog" to ensure compliance with the Bankruptcy Code in cases where no trustee has been appointed.

Accounting staffers within the Trustee's office review all debtor filings, and monitor trustee and attorney fees in all cases. Attorneys employed by the Trustee represent the office in United States bankruptcy court and pursue civil sanctions for some egregious violations of the law in Chapter 7, 12 and 13 cases.

== Executive Office for United States Trustees ==
The Executive Office for United States Trustees (EOUST) is part of The United States Department of Justice (DOJ). The EOUST is the component of the Department of Justice responsible for overseeing the administration of bankruptcy cases and private trustees. The responsibility of the EOUST as the top level office controlling DOJ attorneys who monitor conduct in U.S. Bankruptcy Courts is analogous to that of The Executive Office for United States Attorneys (EOUSA) as responsible for prosecutors of the DOJ. Tara Twomey was appointed Director of the Executive Office for U.S. Trustees (EOUST) on February 27, 2023, but was fired by the Trump Administration March 11, 2025

In contract with the EOUSA, the EOUST maintains indirect publicity and refers to its offices as the "U.S. Trustee Program".

=== Criminal referral ===
When a government attorney working at the EOUST or any of its regional or field offices observes or suspects any criminal activity, it must be referred to the United States Attorney's Office in the District in which the suspected crime occurred. The official policy of the EOUST is to include a review of such criminal referrals as part of the employee evaluation for each DOJ attorney employed as a U.S. Trustee.
