= Interim trustee =

Interim trustee is a term of art in section 701 of the Bankruptcy Code, Title 11 of the United States Code.

When a case under Chapter 7 of the Code is commenced, the United States Trustee immediately appoints an interim trustee for that case. The most important immediate duty of the interim trustee is to conduct the first meeting of creditors (sometimes called the "341 meeting"), at which the bankrupt person is required to appear and respond to questions under oath concerning the person's assets and debts.

If the creditors do not elect some other person qualified to serve as trustee for the case, then the interim trustee becomes the "permanent" trustee. The permanent trustee serves as trustee for the duration of the case, but is subject to removal for good cause. In the overwhelming majority of bankruptcy cases, the interim trustee is not replaced, and serves for the entire case.

Chapter 7 trustees are selected by the U.S. Trustee from a "panel" of individuals residing or having offices in the judicial district where the bankruptcy case is filed. Federal law prohibits the U.S. Trustee from requiring the trustee to be licensed as an attorney. Because trustees must be knowledgeable about bankruptcy law and procedure in order to administer their cases, most panel trustees are, however, attorneys who handle their court responsibilities as a complement to their law practices.

The only other legal pre-requisite for the qualification of the interim trustee is the giving of a surety bond to secure compliance with the trustee's responsibilities in the case. Generally, panel trustees will file a "blanket bond" with the U.S. Trustee's office which covers all cases in which a particular trustee is serving.

== See also ==
- Bankruptcy
