= Buddhist influences on print technology =

Buddhist influences on print technology in East Asia are far-reaching. The history of writing in Asia dates back to the 13th century BC. China used bones and shells for religious inscriptions in the form of divinations. From these beginnings, numerous forms of writing and printing were developed. In many instances, as in Europe, it was religion that played a major role in the development of writing and printing techniques or which was the reason behind the usage of these techniques. Of the religions in East Asia, it was Buddhism that played the strongest role in influencing writing and, in particular, printing. There were other factors that influenced the creation of manuscript and print culture, but Buddhism had the largest influence in spreading the usage of print technology, which in turn led to an increase in the dissemination of secular printing and literacy as well as wielding an important influence on economics, government, and competing religions/philosophies.

== Brief survey of writing & printing in early China ==
The earliest known writing in China are inscriptions on bones and shells which were used for divination for approximately three centuries until the late 11th century BC. Inscriptions can also be found on bronze, jade, stone, and pottery. Bronze was developed as a permanent record of socio-political and ceremonial information in the 2nd or 3rd century AD. Stone, on the other hand, is the only permanent method used continuously from ancient times to present. Also, stone was used extensively for inscriptions on monuments and for the preservation of Confucian, Buddhist, and Taoist texts. Clay inscriptions flourished from the 4th or 5th century BC until the early 4th century AD. These inscriptions were primarily records of names, titles, and phrases such as good luck sayings.(201)

Silk was also used for the recording of information starting in the 7th or 6th century BC. The predecessors to paper-based books in China were strips and tablets made of bamboo or wood, the trees too which were bound by cords and used much like books are today. This method of transmission of information was in use at the same time as the usage of bronze and the other methods. Bamboo and wood was used for approximately three centuries more than paper and silk was in use for some 500 years longer than paper. These methods were favored by tradition and also had some advantages over looks in use today.

There were various methods for the production of early Chinese records. Bone and stone media were engraved or incised with a metal stylus or knife. Wood, bamboo, silk, and paper was written on with brush-pens; the ink was black; usage of ink dates to Neolithic China. Styli were also used and were made of bamboo, wood, horn, and metal, but it is not known when the stylus first came into common usage. Book knives were used as erasers for bamboo and wood tablets but not for inscriptions. Inscriptions on bronze were cast from molds. Inscriptions on clay were made by molds or were impressed with stamps. Seals were used to produce duplicates on soft clays and later on silk and paper. These seals were cast from metals or cut from jade or stone. Before the invention of woodblock printing, inked impressions from stone or other inscriptions would be made by rubbing or squeezing paper over their surfaces. This technique was used up to the early 6th century and led to the invention of printing. Moveable type was invented in China some 400 years before Gutenberg’s press. (1, 202-203)

== Buddhism and printing in China ==
The period following the collapse of the Han (220 AD) is known as (one of the many) “Dark Ages” and was typified by political strife, wars, and social upheaval. Despite the turmoil of that period, learning and culture continued to grow. Among the intellectual elite and rulership, Confucianism continued to be the dominant philosophy. Taoism and Buddhism emerged as religions and began to flourish.

Buddhism, a populist religion, had been introduced to China at the beginning of the Christian Era and quickly became a religion sought after in times of strife by the masses where it was propagated. The first translation of a Buddhist text appeared in China in the 2nd century AD and by the 3rd century the volume of translations had increased a great deal. Buddhism's influence on literature and scholarship grew in relation to the conversion of the elite and ruler ship. (17)

During the Sui dynasty (581-618 AD), Buddhism enjoyed an explosion in the production of printed texts. This is partly due to the reunification of the empire and partly because Emperor Wen decreed that all Buddhist texts then in print were to be copied and placed in temple libraries in all the major cities. Another factor that influenced this increase in printing was the creation of a bureau in 606 AD for the translation of Buddhist texts at the behest of Emperor Yang. To illustrate this diffusion of Buddhist texts, the History of the Sui Dynasty's bibliography lists 1950 Buddhist titles as compared to 377 Taoist titles.

Buddhism was, therefore, probably the most important factor in the development of printing. The demand for Buddhist texts was so great that it encouraged accelerated levels of printing for the following century. Despite the increased demand for Buddhist literature, the production of books by hand did not end. Printing only increased the number of copies of books, thus facilitating the ease and degree of communication. (18, 205)

As Confucianism was the major competing native belief set among the elite, the reason that Buddhist texts enjoyed such widespread printing needs explanation.

Mair suggests that perhaps there is something inherent in Buddhism that is conducive to its being written in what he calls “vernacular Sinitic” as opposed to the “literary Sinitic” used for native Chinese texts. One aspect of Buddhism that Mair cites is the notion of upaya, known as fang-pien in Chinese; followers of the Buddha should do whatever is in their power to do to insure the salvation of all living things.(713) This would certainly help explain why Buddhist texts would be printed and circulated in a written language that is more accessible to a wider audience. Another point Mair makes is that lecture notes for sermons by laymen and monks were written in the vernacular language. This makes sense considering that these notes were to be spoken from; one would not make notes for a sermon in a stilted and highly literary language. Other Buddhist texts such as parables were popular with the masses and so when written, the vernacular is the clear choice.

Another inherent trait that Mair cites is the ostensibly oral nature of Buddhism and how the religion stresses that “…Buddha is beyond the ‘paths of speech’” and “...’the way of language is cut off, the workings of the mind are obliterated’....” (Ibid.) Mair also writes:

“Even the Zen masters, whose words are ironically preserved in written vernacular (perhaps one should say, especially the Zen masters),…’nonestablishment of written words’ (pu li wen-tzu), which disparages the efficacy of language, especially in its written form, to convey essential truths.”(713-714)

Despite this, even Buddhism could not survive and function as a religion without sacred texts. Many Buddhist texts begin with the phrase evam me sutam (ju shih wo wen, “thus I have heard”). Buddhist texts also make use of other expressions such as fo shuo (“spoken by the Buddha”). Mair points out that this underlines the direct oral transmission of Buddha's teachings to the community through Ananda. So, these phrases are a stamp of authenticity for the text, even when a text did not originate in India.(714) Given this oral nature of Buddhism, it makes sense that its texts would be rendered in vernacular rather than literary Chinese.

The strongest explanation for the use of vernacular, and by extension the rapid spread of Buddhism and its influence on print culture, is the process by which Buddhism was introduced to China. Mair argues that the process of translation was what influenced the use of vernacular in Chinese Buddhist texts. Commerce also played a strong role, but this will be discussed later. It was foreigners that began the process of translation into Chinese (“…the early impetus for the translation of Buddhist texts into Sinitic came primarily from foreign monks resident in China.”)(714–715, 717) What Mair calls “literary Sinitic” is an extremely difficult language to learn, “…requiring at least ten to fifteen years to gain a modicum of proficiency.”(716) These foreign translators were adults when they came to China and most likely learned spoken Chinese through immersion in the culture before learning how to write the language. When it came time to write, they used the language they knew which was the vernacular. Also, when it was Chinese Buddhists working on writing a text, they worked in teams with other Chinese dictating their translations. Obviously since literary Chinese is unspeakable, the dictation was done in the vernacular. (Ibid.)

The above argument is the strongest for what might be called the mechanical process for the rapid spread of Buddhism and the vast amount of texts available (and the rise in the use of printing) to a wider audience. What is also a very important aspect in the spread of Buddhism and its influence on printing is the ideological aspects of Buddhism. As opposed to the native Chinese religions/philosophies, Buddhism is a populist religion. As Mair writes: “…Buddhism functioned (and perhaps originated) as a means for the individual to escape from the normal societal bonds.” (719) Buddhism appealed to the dispossessed, those that were outside the Confucian institutions. Because Confucianism stressed a rigid social order, many people found themselves stuck in a social position they could not escape from.

The Buddhist community in China consisted of, for example, a large number of widows, orphans, and others that had no place in the fabric of Confucian society. Literary Chinese was associated with the elite; those that could afford to attend the bureaucratic schools for example. Buddhism aggressively pursued the conversion of followers and to move into a new area such as China(721), it makes sense that Buddhism would make use of the vernacular in its texts; it was more accessible to the masses. Because of this accessibility there was an increased demand for texts and thus the rise in printing.(720)

Mair cites Daniel Gardner and his work on Neo-Confucianism. It seems that the vernacular was employed in Neo-Confucian texts because of its:

“…more inquisitive approach it permitted toward the classics…Considering the powerful influence of Buddhism

on the formation of Neo-Confucian thought and practice, the adoption of the written vernacular as a legitimate form of serious intellectual discussion would seem to be one more example of the radical restructuring of Confucianism brought about by this foreign religion.” (Ibid.)

So, not only did Buddhism wield an influence on printing, but also it also influenced society at large in adapting to the norms of Buddhist thought. These influences were manifested in literature, philosophy, government, etc. As Mair writes, “...may be analyzed sociolinguistically as emanating from the fundamentally demotic impulses of the religion."(721)

== Buddhism and printing in Korea ==
The story of printing in Korea is slightly different from in China, but Buddhism did play an important role in the development of printing. Just as in China and Japan, woodblock printing was the primary technique used for printing, but a scarcity of resources needed for the production of woodblocks in Korea created a need for the invention of an alternative, which was moveable type. Korea was in the unique position among Asian countries of having an alphabet that facilitated the use of moveable type. This is not to say that woodblocks were not used. Once moveable type came into use, Korea was no longer quite as dependent on China for texts.

Sometime in the 4th century the Chinese educational system was introduced to what was then the Koguryo state. A civil service examination system was established in Silla after the Korean states consolidated in the 7th century. As the power of the government grew, demand for books from China increased. Korea began to print its own texts and books from woodblocks in the 10th century. Prior to 1056 Korea was mainly a manuscript culture. Complaints from a provincial capital spurred the government to order copies from the royal collection to be printed. Newly carved woodblocks were sent from the provinces to the royal library, which spurred the production of more woodblocks. (97)

Other than the perceived (and possibly true) unreliability of manuscript copies, religion provided an additional stimulus for the printing of texts from woodblocks, just as in the other countries of East Asia. A large scale carving of woodblocks for the purpose of printing the Tripitaka was undertaken starting sometime around 1014. During the last twenty odd years of the 11th century, more Tripitaka woodblocks were carved, in addition to woodblocks for other Chinese Buddhist works. The demand for Buddhist texts, as well as Confucian texts, grew in the following years. Most of these were subsequently destroyed during the Mongol invasions.

At the time, Korea was rather zealous in its attempts to acquire Buddhist (and other) texts and utilized whatever means it could to acquire texts. In addition to trade with Song China, Korea bought books from private markets (once again, commerce and Buddhism will be discussed later). The zealousness Korea had to acquire Buddhist texts also provided an impetus for the printing of texts. By the end of the 11th century Korea had better copies of common texts as well as rare copies of certain editions. Previously the flow of books was mainly from China to Korea, but in 1091 China asked Korea for 117 books that no longer existed in China's libraries, a situation similar to that in Europe a few centuries earlier where Ireland had preserved Christian texts no longer in existence on the continent. This illustrates the strong role that Buddhism played in printing. Buddhism provided the stimulus to keep as many texts in print as possible. When these texts were lost in China, Korea proved to be an important repository of Buddhist literature due to its commitment to the printing of Buddhist texts.

Buddhism also played a role in the development of moveable type. Religion was not the only contributing factor in Korea's development of moveable type. First, the Song dynasty (which was apparently the only source outside of Korea for books) fled south after the Chin invasion in 1127. Second, many of Korea's libraries were destroyed resulting in the loss of many texts and woodblocks during a power struggle in the royal court. Thirdly, the scarcity of hardwoods used in the production of woodblocks in Korea contributed to the need for a more readily made printing source. Pine was the most common wood available in Korea at the time, but is not a good source for woodblocks. There was birch, but these trees were not common and were to be found mostly on mountainous terrain making it difficult to get to and expensive to transport. (98)

The Koreans at that time were most likely already aware of moveable type as it had already been invented in China. In China, moveable type was made from baked clay, but the Koreans improved upon this by making cast-type. Metal casting existed in Korea, but with the introduction of a new method of coin casting from China in 1102, Korea finally had the technology to create an effective method of printing using moveable type. This method of casting came in the form of carving two molds that were joined with the liquid metal presumably being poured into the hollow thus created. (98–100) So with the zealous desire for Buddhist texts, the scarcity of resources for woodblock production, the introduction of new technology, and the cessation of trade with China, Korea was able to continue to print Buddhist texts.

There are other examples of how Buddhism stimulated printing in Korea. Despite the difficulties the Mongol invasion presented, printing of texts continued. While in exile on Kangwha Island, the Koryo government re-carved a woodblock edition of a Buddhist text crucial to the Son sect that had become scarce. Sohn also suggests that the invention of moveable type was due to the general scarcity of books after 1127 but before the Mongol invasion. Sohn mentions that there was an urgent need for these texts. (98) What he does not mention, and I would suggest, is that moveable type was used because it would have taken too long to re-carve the woodblocks. Thus moveable type was utilized to meet the urgent demand for the texts.

There is more evidence for the influence that Buddhism had on the printing of texts. In 1446, King Sejong introduced the Hunmin chong um, a text that introduced the new system for writing vernacular Korean. In the preface to this text, there is a line (“Even the sound of the winds, the cry of the crane, the cackle of fowl and the barking of dogs – all may be written” [Mair, 733]) that is derived from a Sung scholar (Cheng Ch’iao) that “praises the phonological sophistication of the Buddhist monks.” The fact that Sejong was a devout Buddhist could possibly also be seen as evidence of the Buddhist influence on printing. All but two of the earliest texts using Sejong's Hunmin chong um were Buddhist texts. Also, Hunmin chong um is based partly on Phags-pa that can be traced back to Srong-brtsan-sgam-po, the king who introduced Buddhism to Tibet. “The Buddhist impetus, in turn, carried through to King Sejong’s Hunmin chong um.” (731, 734) This illustrates that not only did Buddhism wield an influence on printing, but also on language reform, which in turn further influenced printing. With the introduction of Hunmin chong um, printing using moveable type in Korea became much more practical.

There are a number of differences between China and Korea which rendered moveable type easier for Korea than China. First, China did not have a script reform that made the use of moveable type more practical as in Korea. The large number of characters used in written Chinese posed a great challenge to the use of moveable type. Instead of making type for every character all at once, why not make new type as it was needed? In this way a gradual shift to moveable type printing could have been accomplished. Second, the historical record shows that in China there was a preference for that which was already established and familiar (e.g. the preference of bamboo/wood books over the usage of paper books). Chinese moveable type was made from baked clay, rendering it breakable.

== Buddhism and printing in Japan ==
Little is known about the techniques and procedures used for woodblock printing before 1600 in Japan; printing and publishing in the Tokugawa period became more commercialized and thus there is more information about it. (47)

First a manuscript is passed to a copyist and a clean copy (hanshita) is written out. Sometimes a calligrapher would be employed to make a copy when quality calligraphy was desired, although the author often prepared the copy. Second, the hanshita was given to the block-carver who pasted the hanshita face down onto a wooden block and carved away the white parts leaving the text, illustrations, and borders in relief. Third, the block was passed to the printer who inked the block, laid a sheet of paper on it, and then rubbed the paper to make the impression. Sometimes a printing was made for the purpose of proofreading but this seems to have been rather rare. It is not clear how much proofreading was done but it was done for the more important texts. (52) Fourth, when enough copies were printed they were passed to someone who aligned the pages. Lastly, a cover was made and the book was finally bound. (47, 48)

The reproduction of texts was done by the technique called kabusebori. Reproduction was an unstable process. Copies would be made from earlier editions of the text by using the text itself as the hanshita. The woodblock resulting from this technique of duplication was similar but not an exact replica. This method was used during the Muromachi period to reproduce Chinese texts and also when a popular text needed to be reprinted but the original woodblocks were worn down, damaged, or lost. (49) This method was also used when particular pages of a text needed to be replaced such as when some woodblocks were more worn than others or when a family or business needed to update its directories. (52)

Umeki was another technique used to make corrections to a text to avoid censorship or when mistakes were made during the carving process. A portion of the woodblock would be carved out and removed, then replaced with the corrected text on a portion of wood measuring the same dimensions as that which had been removed. (52)

Print technology was introduced to Japan in the 8th century but it took approximately 1000 years for Japan to become a print culture when printing had finally become commercialized. (112) Initially printing in Japan was a ritual exercise for the production of devotional texts and it was not until the 11th century that texts were printed for the purpose of reading. This was much the case in China although calendars and Buddhist texts had been printed for reading for quite some time. Therefore, printing reached Japan from China in the form of a ritual practice. (113)

The only surviving evidence of printing from the 8th century Japan comes from Nara in the form of the Hyakumantō Darani. (115) The Hyakumantō Darani are slips of paper with Buddhist text printed on them installed in miniature pagoda that were placed at various locations in Nara. They were apparently made to atone for a rebellion that took place 746. The rebellion was in response to the growing influence Buddhism had in the Japanese court; a Buddhist monk, Dōkyō, had been able to have himself appointed to the position of Chancellor of the Realm. The interference in courtly matters by the Buddhist clergy led to much resentment and Fujiwara no Nakamaro led a rebellion against Dōkyō. The ex-Empress Shōtoku ordered the printing of one million charms to appease the Buddhist monks and temples, although it is unclear whether this order was fully carried out. (87–88) Very few of the dharani survived to this day.(89) Hyakumantō Darani represent the earliest existing proof (from Japan) that Buddhism was an influence on printing in East Asia.

Inbutsu, religious stamps depicting the Buddha, were common in pre-Heian times and continued to be made through the Heian period.(117) Further evidence of printing in the Heian period comes in the form of books and other texts imported from China by Japanese monks returning to Japan from China and Chinese monks and travelers. Devotional printing was common in Heian Japan. Fujiwara no Michinaga's diary (1009 AD) mentions that 1000 copies of the “Lotus Sutra” were commissioned but none of these survive. It seems that the paper that these devotional texts were printed on was of poor quality and this explains why so few of them exist to this day. The reason for printing these devotional texts lay in the meritorious act of reproducing sacred texts, not in the reading of them. Therefore, there was no concern for the fate of the texts after being printed since the act of printing them was what brought about merit. (118) As described above, Buddhist influence on printing in Japan was initially for gaining merit with the Buddha and great effort was put into printing texts for this reason. Because Japan during the Nara and Heian periods was primarily a manuscript culture and texts for reading were hand copied, Buddhism's influence on print had yet to exhibit the influence it did in China.

Practical printing can be dated to the 11th century, during the Heian era when Chinese texts from the Song dynasty became popular in Japan in the form of commentaries on sutras and doctrines. Nara became the center of non-devotional printing in Heian Japan and the oldest existing example of this kind is the Joyuishikiron (a Buddhist text in Chinese) of 1088 printed by the monks of the Kōfuku-ji temple. Kyoto became the center of devotional printing because this is where the aristocratic sponsorship for such printing existed. (118–119)

During the Kamakura period printing became more established and began to shift its emphasis from devotional printing to practical printing. Inbutsu continued to be produced but their production began to expand to more populist images such as the Amida Buddha and Jizō. The Kōfuku-ji was important in the shift to practical printing as well as other temples such as Todaiji, Daianji, and Saidaiji. The monasteries of Mt. Koya also began printing texts of the Shingon sect, continuously printing up to the 19th century. It was during the Kamakura period that Kyoto began to be a center of printing. The 13th-century temple Sen’yuji was one of the most prominent. Its founder, Shunjo, had brought back books from China and reproduced them using the kabusebori technique. Texts from Song editions relating to monastic discipline were also printed. Kyoto temples also began printing Pure Land Sect texts during the Kamakura period but the location and dates of production is unknown. (119–121)

It is from the Pure Land Sect that the first book printed in Japanese, the Kurodani shonin gotoroku (1321), originates. It is most likely due to the populist nature of the Pure Land Sect that this text was printed in Japanese. It was a collection of sayings by the sect's founder Honen (1133–1212). It was printed in hiragana with kanji glossed with furigana. Later in the 14th century more of Honen's works were printed. The Pure Land Sect was one of the first Buddhist sects responsible for reaching out to a general audience through the print medium in the Kamakura period. (121)

Zen sects had the largest influence on printing during the Kamakura and Muromachi periods. Texts came from five monasteries in Kyoto and five in Kamakura and later other Zen temples began to print texts. It was with the Zen-printed texts that an educational element began to enter into the act of printing. These texts were reproductions of Zen master sayings intended for the training of novices and disseminating the teachings to lay persons. Devotionals were still printed but when Zen monasteries printed devotional texts it was at the behest of sponsors rather than the monasteries themselves. (121–122)

Gozan-ban (the name given to texts printed by Zen sects) were for the most part written by Chinese authors but some were by Japanese authors (monks). They were also kabusebori editions so they looked like Chinese editions. Chinese monks also assisted in the printing of Gozan-ban. Eight Chinese monks had traveled to Kyoto in the 14th century (1367) and these monks were mostly block-carvers and printers employed by the Japanese monks and temples. Some texts, though, were printed at the expense of the Chinese monks. Most of the Gozan-ban were Zen and other Buddhist texts but some were secular texts of Chinese origin. It was in the 14th century that the first non-Buddhist texts were printed. By the 16th century a large number of secular Chinese texts had been printed by Zen temples. It would seem then that the Zen monks were the custodians of Chinese culture in Japan. (122)

From the 14th to 16th century secular texts are divided into three categories: 1) canonical texts, 2) dictionaries and other sinological reference texts, and 3) poetic texts. The first secular Chinese text to be printed was Confucius’ Analects, printed in Sakai in 1364 with commentaries by the third century scholar He Yan. In 1528, some Chinese medical texts were printed. Not all the secular texts were printed by Zen monks, but one quarter of the Gozan-ban were secular texts and printed in Japan for the first time. The Zen monks' interest in secular Chinese literature resulted in much of the Chinese poetry and Confucian literature printed. (123)

By the 16th century printing was well established but had yet to become commercial. Prior to this, the printing of books for reading was done primarily by Buddhist monasteries and monks and were mostly Buddhist texts in the original Chinese. These books may have been made available for sale. Little is known how the books were circulated before the Tokugawa era. (124-125)

Buddhism influenced both printing and reading. The earliest references to reading in Japan relates to Buddhist texts. (251) There is a question regarding “reading” because at first Buddhist texts were printed as a meritorious act and “reading” was secondary. Buddhist texts were studied and there was a ritualized reading of them. When discussing reading of the sutras and other tests, “reading” takes a number of forms: silent vs. chanted, individual vs. mass/group. During the Nara and Heian periods, there was a number of public readings of Buddhist texts for devotional and other religious reasons. (252)

Buddhism played a large role in literacy during the Nara and Heian periods. Because Buddhism was a scriptural religion, literacy in Chinese was required because texts available to the Japanese were printed in Chinese. During the Heian period it was men who were for the most part literate in Chinese (most likely the “literary Sinetic” that Mair refers to) but there is proof that some women were literate in Chinese as well. After the Heian period Buddhism remained a text-based religion and it was the Zen monks were particularly interested in secular Chinese texts. The literacy in Chinese that was thought to be so important during the Nara and Heian periods became less stringent during the Kamakura and Muromachi periods. Literacy gave way to the Sino-Japanese kanbun. The literate were most likely to be found in the Zen monasteries during these periods. (270–271) Literacy began to rise during the Tokugawa period as a result of printing becoming commercialized and the Tokugawa bureaucracy had become dependent on printed and written communications among the various government offices in the capital and provinces. (272–273)

So from the Nara period on, literacy in Chinese was important for the Japanese bureaucracy, but more important for the reproduction of Buddhist texts and the production of commentaries on Buddhist texts. In the 7th and 8th centuries the greatest efforts at manuscript and printed text (by extension) production was for the copying of Buddhist texts. There is evidence that the entire Buddhist canon existent in Japan had been copied by 673. By 700 there was a large number of Buddhist temples and monasteries that required texts. By 727 the government had established a sutra scriptorium (the Shakyojo) in Nara that was the center of sutra-copying. It did not survive the move to Heian-kyō. The number of surviving printed Buddhist texts, as opposed to printed secular texts, helps to illustrate the influence Buddhism had on printing. (91)

== Commerce and Buddhism ==
Buddhism and commerce were also tied closely together. The two stimulated each other in a cyclical fashion such that, among other things, printing was influenced to a large degree.

The official histories of China, Korea, Japan, and other Asian societies largely neglected to record a number of commercial enterprises that the elite (bureaucracy) were not directly involved with. The elite (bureaucracy) was only concerned with official missions and held an elitist view regarding the merchants and other commoners that partook in trade with neighboring societies and cultures, which contributes to the manner in which Buddhism was able to infiltrate these societies. Buddhism followed the same routes the merchants used. As Buddhism spread, so did the demand for religious artifacts and literature. Buddhism also stimulated religious pilgrimages which in turn stimulated trade. These factors stimulated the growth of local economies and the production of artifacts and the printing of religious texts. This all often went unnoticed by the elite who would otherwise have been vehemently opposed to the spread of Buddhist doctrine.

Besides the stimulation of commerce and travel, Buddhism assisted trade by providing a social lubricant. As Holcombe states, “The Buddhist spirit minimized regional differences.”(283) Because of its universalistic philosophy, followers of the religion from different cultures who behaved differently, looked different, and so on, were still able to engage in commerce because they held a common faith. This in turn helped to propel the spread of Buddhism to other regions.(282–283)

Buddhist missionaries would accompany private trading caravans and sailing vessels along established trade routes into regions that were untouched by Buddhism. Sometimes those missionaries would settle in these regions and establish schools/missions or, during the voyage, would convert merchants and traders who would in turn settle in these new regions, raising families, and assisting in the dissemination of the Buddhist faith.(285) Sometimes this immigration was accidental, as in the case with Japan. At the time sailing between Japan, China, and Korea was a dangerous affair, so it is understandable that many of these “immigrants” would opt to remain in Japan (or wherever it was they landed), as happened with ten Paekche monks blown off course as they were sailing to China. The elite, for the most part, ignored travelers that were not members of official missions so it is plausible that the number of immigrants such as the Paekche monks was much higher than the official immigrant count indicates.(288–289)

Commerce and trade facilitated the spread of Buddhism to new regions and with it the spread of Buddhist texts which stimulated the growth of printing industries. The extensive book trade between Sung China and Korea as well as the employment of Chinese monks by Japanese temples and monasteries was a common practice. It is very important to keep in mind the role commerce played in the printing of Buddhist texts.

== Conclusion ==
As mentioned above, the Japanese case provides the best example of how Buddhism influenced printing. In China the religion was a populist one, which actively sought out those that were marginalized by Confucian society. Korea had a voracious appetite for Buddhist texts and the combination of the scarcity of resources for woodblock printing as well as the Mongol invasions stimulated the use of new printing technologies. As Mair writes, “There is little doubt that printing in East Asia, from its inception, was primarily a Buddhist phenomenon.”(736) Buddhism, being a universalistic and populist religion, as well as its zealous conversion of the common person to its faith, was able to utilize print technology like no other religion at the time was able to. The ostensibly oral origins of the religion allowed Buddhism to utilize vernacular language in the printed form to reach a much wider audience than Confucianism, Taoism, or other religions. So in this way Buddhism was able to wield an influence on print technology that was unknown before its introduction to East Asia.
