= INTERIM-Theater =

Coordinates: 48°08′22″N 11°29′59″E

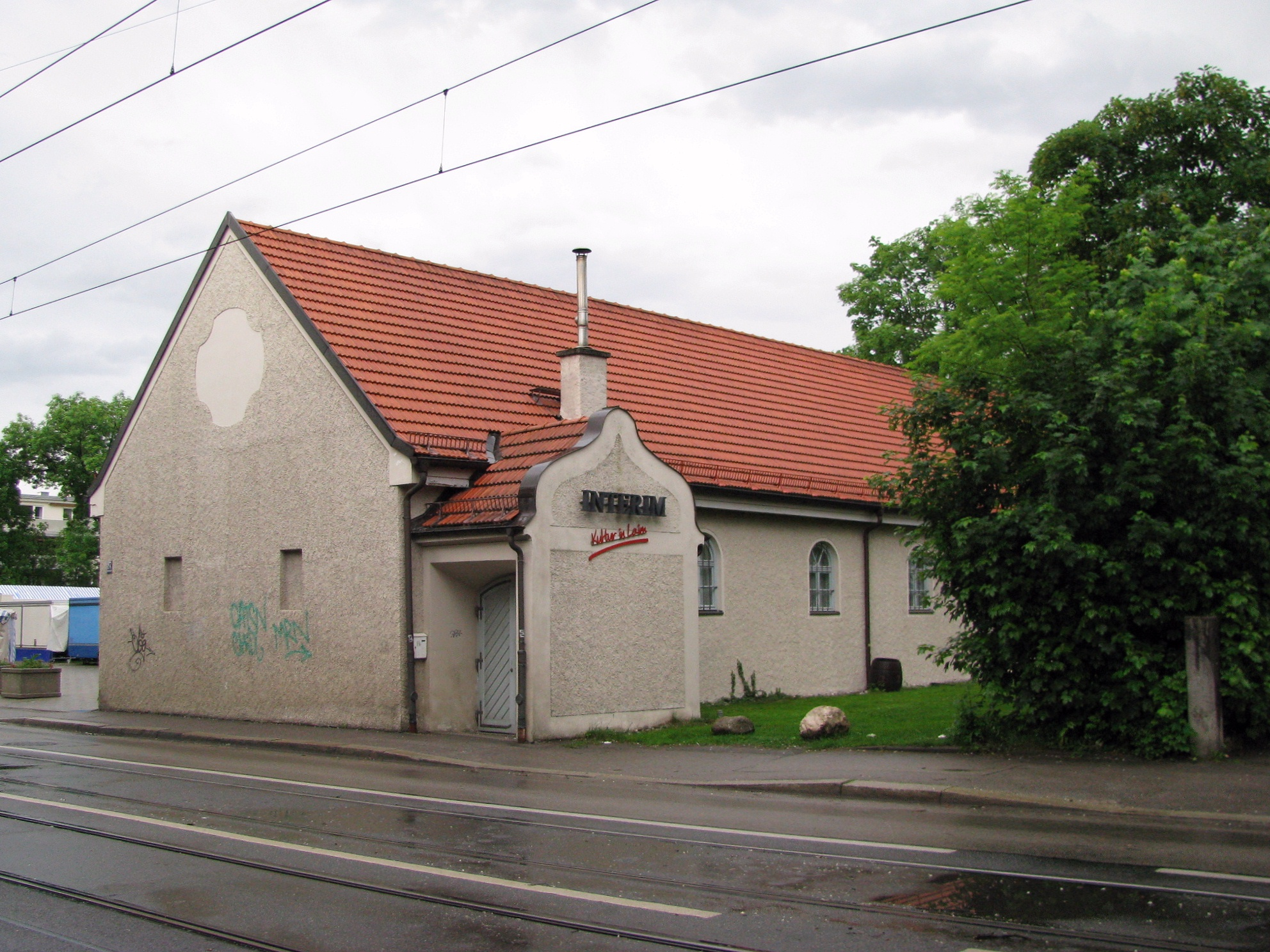
The Interim-Theater, Munich

INTERIM-Theater is a theatre in Munich, Bavaria, Germany.
