= Life of Buddha in art =

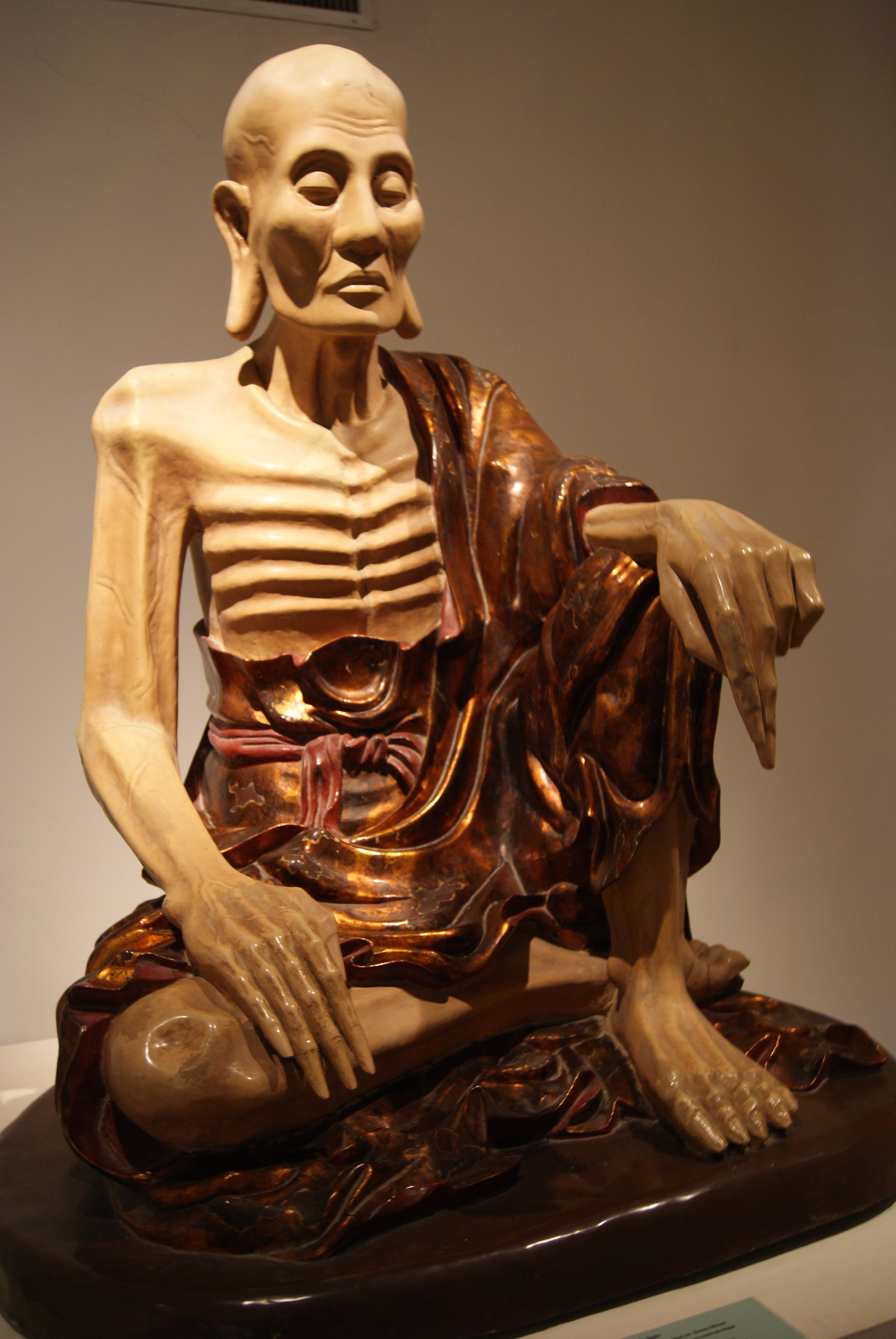
Buddha in his period of austerities, Vietnam, 1794, lacquered wood

Narrative images of episodes from the life of Gautama Buddha in art have been intermittently an important part of Buddhist art, often grouped into cycles, sometimes rather large ones. However, at many times and places, images of the Buddha in art have been very largely single devotional images without narrative content from his life on Earth.

The literary accounts of the life of Gautama Buddha vary considerably in details but are mostly consistent in describing the main events. One of the largest surviving bodies of artistic depictions is the rather small stone reliefs of Gandharan art, beginning in the 1st century BC and continuing for several centuries. These reliefs probably reflected subjects in paintings, both murals and illustrating manuscripts, none of which survive. Their range of about 50 subjects is large, and very rarely exceeded in later art, except in the 120 large reliefs at Borobudor in Java, Indonesia, (but 27 of these are of subjects before his birth); in East Asian Buddhism some new biographical subjects appeared much later, but otherwise the Gandharan subjects include the great majority of scenes appearing later.

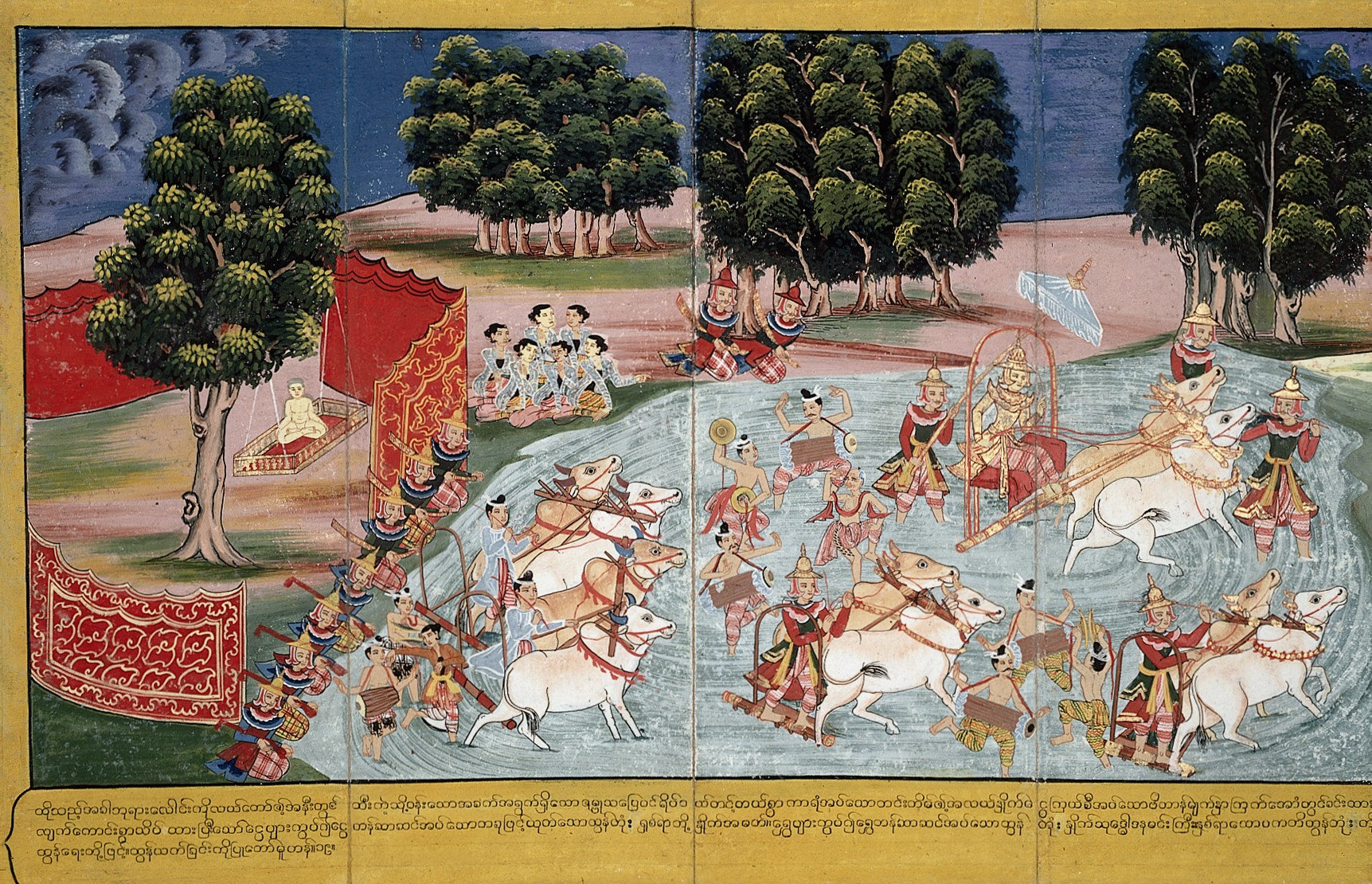
The Buddha's first meditation, as his father leads a ploughing ceremony. Buddha sits on a swing at left, shown as very young. Burmese manuscript, 19th century.

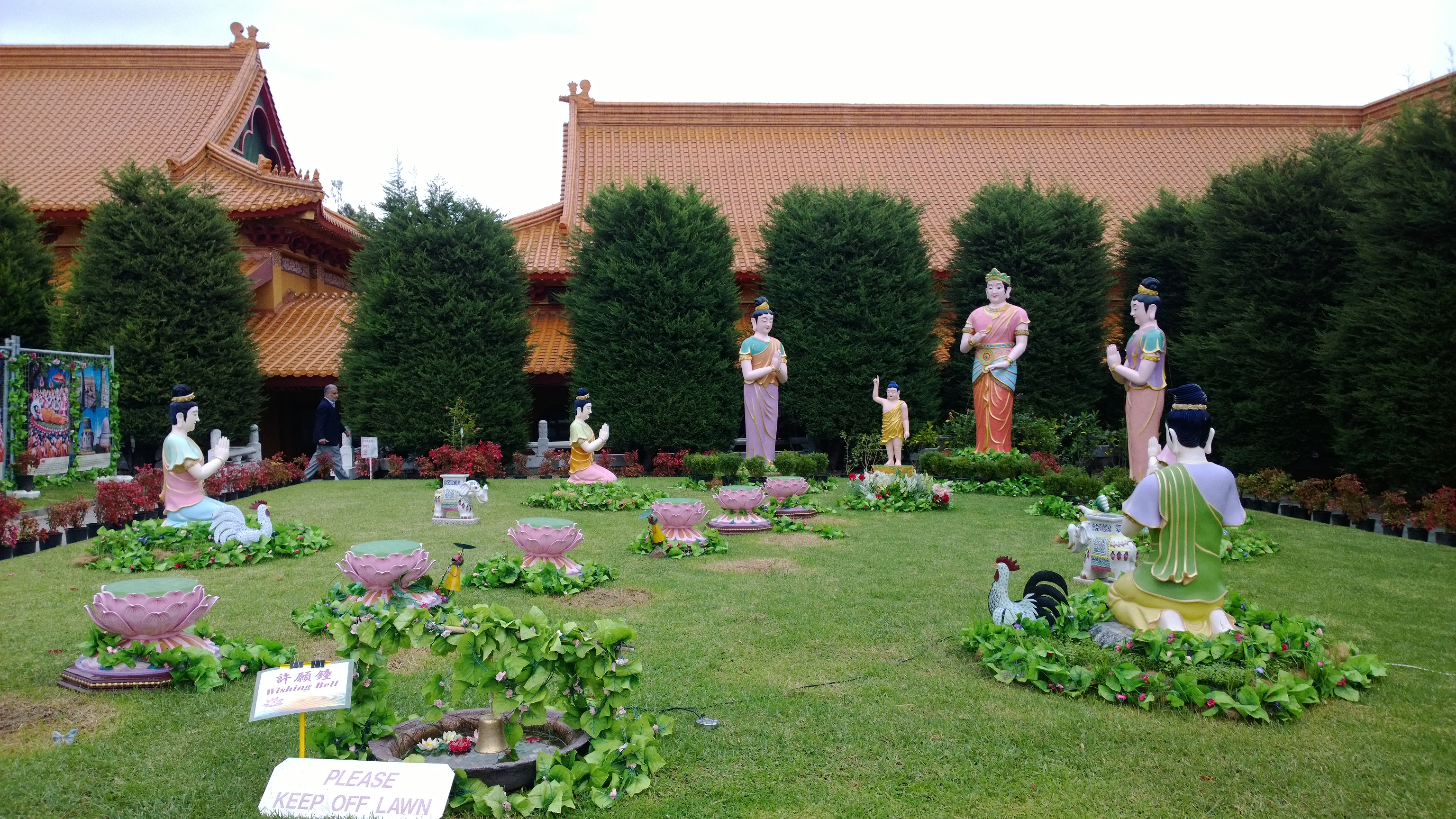
The First Seven Steps of the Buddha, at a temple in Australia

The 9th-century Borobudor reliefs illustrate the Lalitavistara Sūtra, a Mahayana text, originally in Sanskrit, probably from the 3rd century. This only covers the life up to the Buddha's first Sermon. There is also a large body of Jataka tales, relating events from the many previous lives of Gautama Buddha, which were often subjects in Gandhara and early Indian art. By contrast, narrative scenes from the history of Buddhism after the Buddha's death are very few.

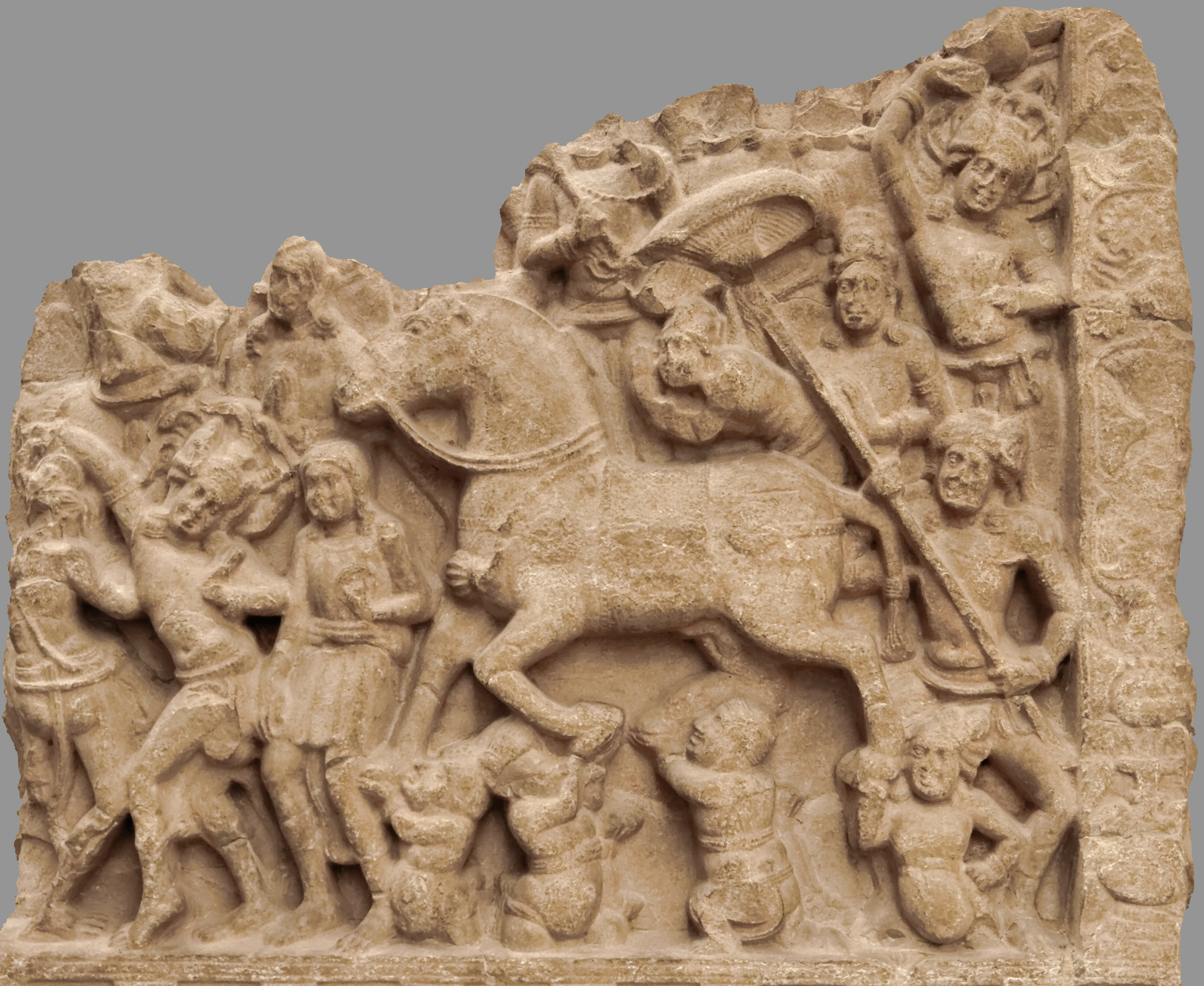
The Great Departure, Amaravati style, 2nd century, aniconic with a riderless horse

In post-Gupta India a number of the most important scenes were grouped together; again stone reliefs on steles have survived, but painted versions only from later periods, and mostly from other countries. The most important grouping was The Eight Great Events in the Life of Buddha. In Tibetan Buddhism ten or twelve scenes were more common in painted thankas, the twelve being the "twelve actions (or deeds) of the Buddha". There are much larger numbers of painted scenes surviving from more recent centuries, especially from South-East Asia. With the arrival of printing, book illustrations and posters continued the tradition. Some scenes became established subjects in Chinese and Japanese painting, and later prints.

== The Historical Buddha ==
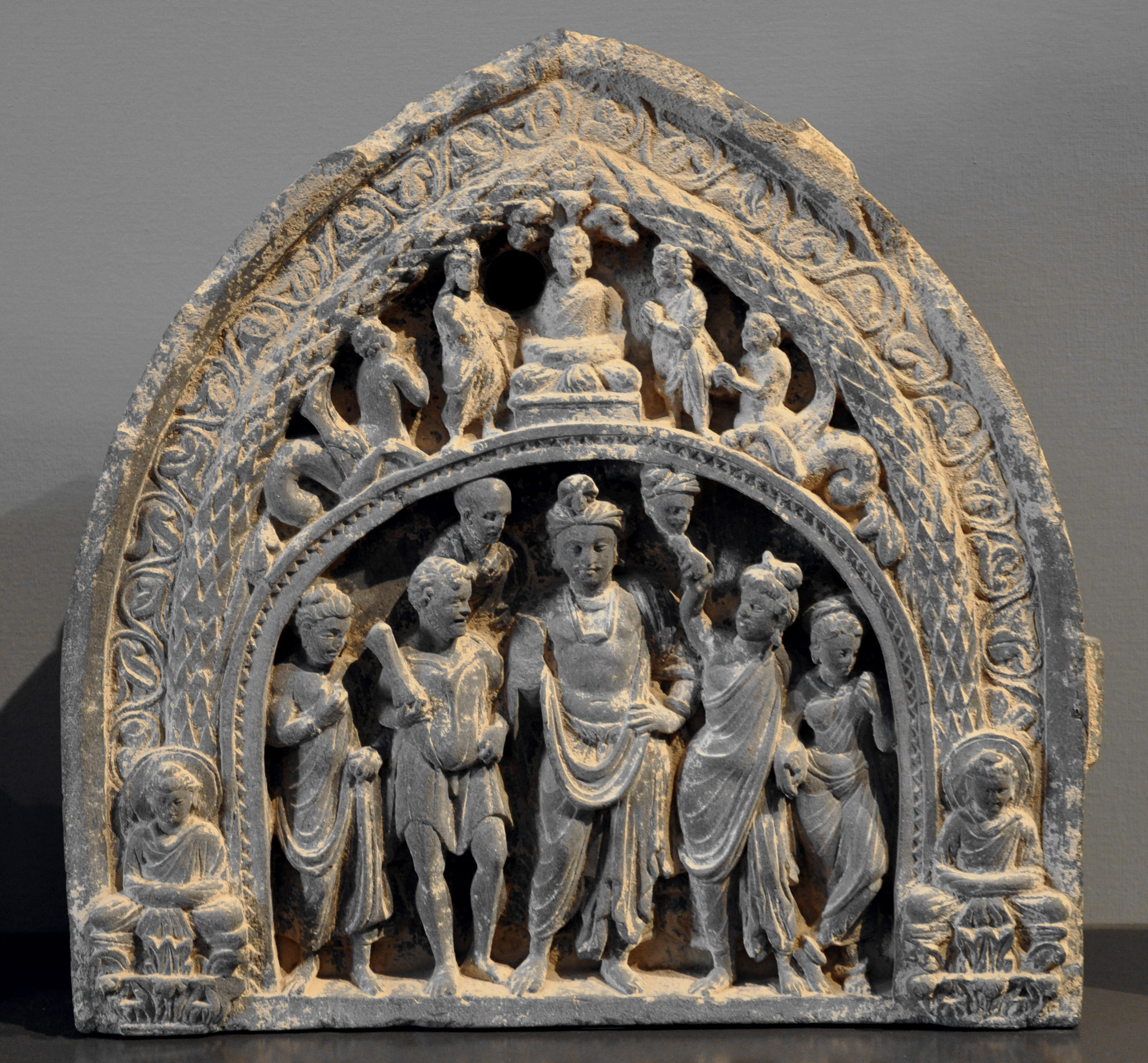
The Wedding of Siddharta (below) on a "false gable" projecting from a small stupa. Gandhara

The "Historical Buddha" or Gautama Buddha was born at Lumbini, in modern terms a little way into Nepal from the border with India. According to the traditional Buddhist chronology, he was born around 563 BC, and lived eighty years until his death c. 483 BC. Modern scholarship prefers later dates, essentially working backwards from his death and not having an alternative age at death, with estimates of the death date mostly around 411 to 400, giving birth dates around 491 to 480 BC.

According to tradition, which is, as reflected in texts and art, effectively the only source for his biography, he was born the son of Suddhodhana, who is always treated as a king (raja) in later texts and art, but was probably the elected leader of the Shakya Republic, and grew up at Kapilavastu, a "city" for which two nearby claimant sites exist, in India and (more probably) Nepal. He was known as Siddharta Gautama in his pre-religious life, Siddharta meaning "He who achieves His Goal", with "Gautama" the name of his clan. Later he was called Shakyamuni ("sage of the Shakya clan"). His mother, Maya died within a week of his birth, and he was raised by his aunt Pajapati, who was also a wife of his father. The scale of luxury of this life is no doubt greatly exaggerated in later texts and art, reflecting that of the most important monarchies of the day, but it was presumably a very comfortable life.

He was married at 16, to the daughter of a Shakya noble. It was twelve years before a child was born, by which time Siddharta, then aged 29, had decided to renounce the life his father wanted for him, for that of a Śramaṇa ascetic. The night his son Rahula was born he secretly left the palace for good, and started living as a mendicant ascetic. He studied with two teachers of meditation and yoga, and became drawn to extreme asceticism. Eventually he realized that this was not the correct path, and developed the philosophy of the Middle Way. At the age of 35 he was meditating under a Bodhi Tree at Bodh Gaya when he experienced his enlightenment. From now on, he is typically referred to as "the Buddha", rather than Shakyamuni.

He remained meditating at Bodh Gaya for six or seven weeks before leaving to spread the new teachings he had developed. His first sermon, known as the Sermon in the Deer Park, was given at Sarnath to five companions he had known since his ascetic period. He spent the remaining 45 (or so) years of his life travelling around modern Bihar and eastern Uttar Pradesh preaching and collecting disciples.

The Buddha died in the company of some of his followers, according to tradition at the age of eighty. He was cremated, and his ashes and some of his possessions distributed to centres of his movement. The veneration of his relics, called cetiya, became important in Buddhism.

The earliest biographical texts are all preserved only in manuscripts from much later, often with texts that have been translated into a non-Indian language, for example Chinese or Tibetan. Modern scholars believe that they probably contain later additions. They differ considerably in details, but generally are consistent with each other and with the earliest art regarding the main outlines of the life, which generally predates the textual versions that have survived. Even those believed to represent the earliest versions have many miraculous or legendary elements, which only increase in later versions.

In the texts the life of the Buddha is followed with enormous interest by large numbers of gods and other figures, who sometimes come to earth to intervene or merely witness, as shown in depictions of the Great Departure. The Gandharan reliefs seem to have followed the biographical details in the Abhiniṣkramaṇa Sūtra, a text that now only survives in Chinese translations.

== Events shown in art: early life ==
=== Return to Earth ===
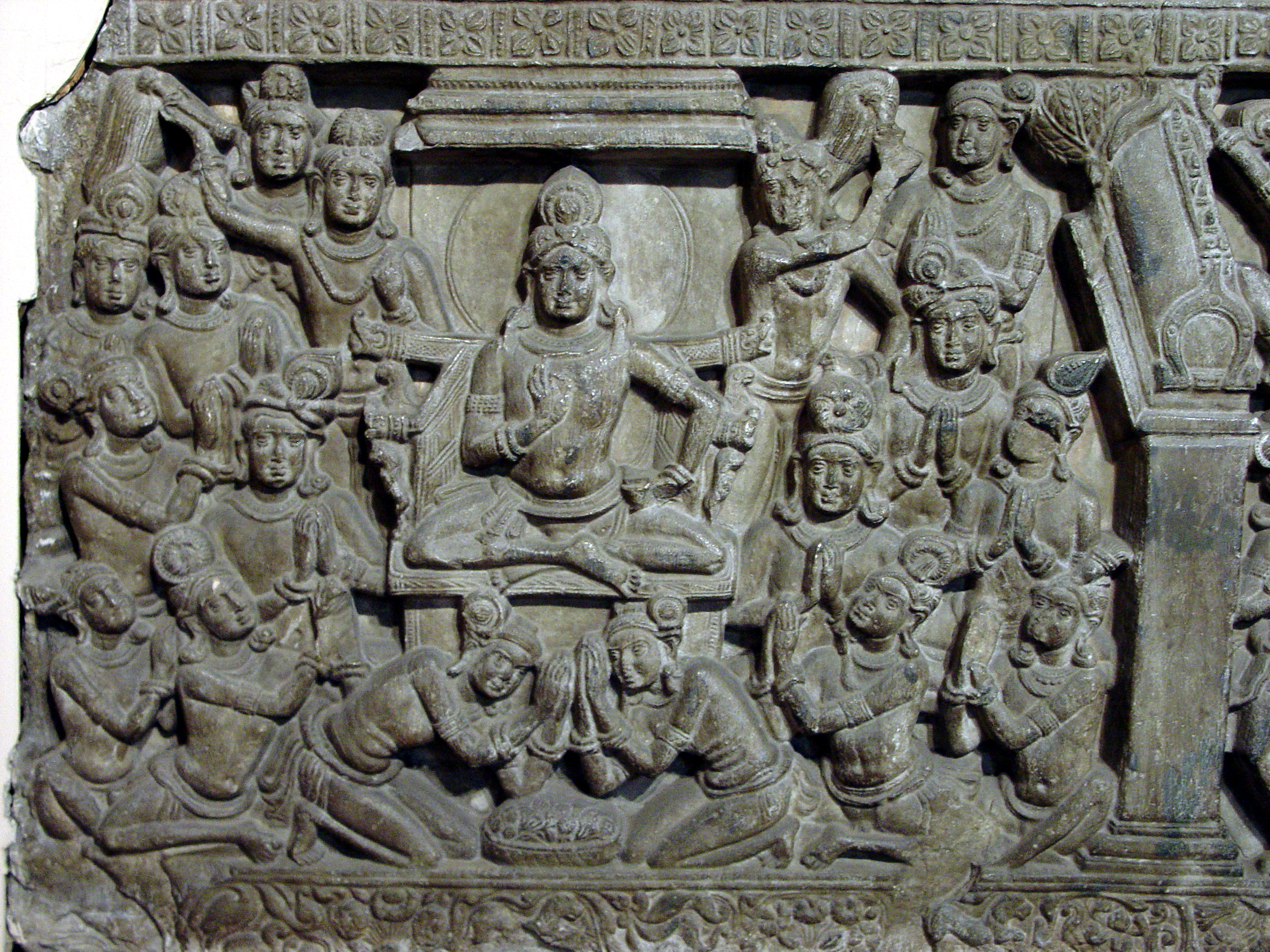
The future Siddharta preaching in Tushita Heaven. Amaravati, 2nd century

In Buddhism, the story of the Buddha's final incarnation begins before his conception or birth. After great numbers of previous lives, the future Buddha, usually regarded as already a bodhisattva, was in the Tushita heaven when he decided to live a final life on Earth. After lengthy considerations, he made his choice of a family to be born into. In some accounts, Maitreya was at this point named by the Buddha as the next buddha. These scenes are often shown in art; at Borobudor there are 27 panels preceding Buddha's birth.

=== Queen Maya's dream ===
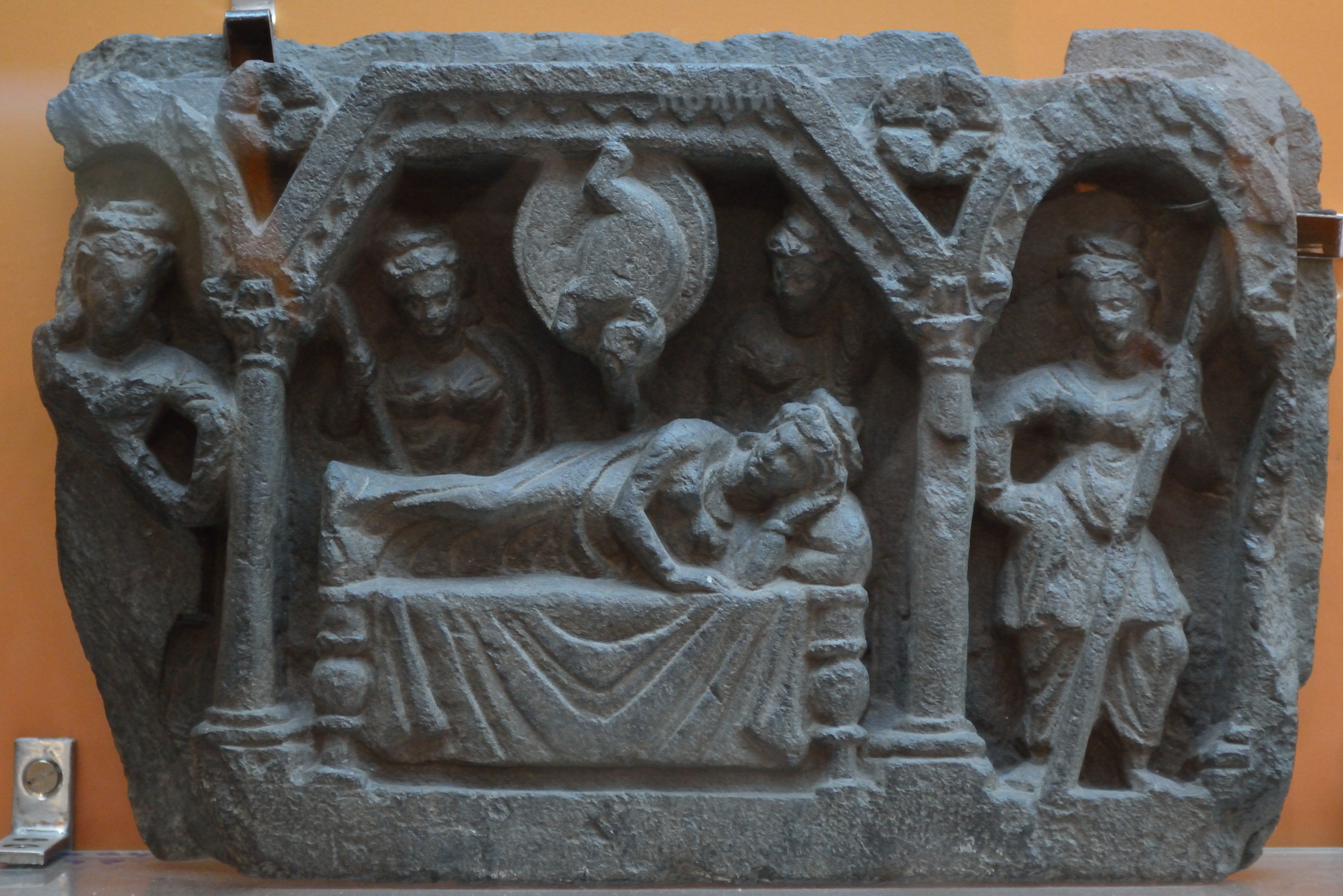
Queen Maya's Dream, c. 2nd century, Gandharan from Mardan

Queen Maya, mother of the Buddha, dreamed one night that a white elephant holding a white lotus, and with six tusks, entered her womb through her side. In an earlier life, the Buddha had taken this form. The next day she discovered she was pregnant. She told her husband King Suddhodhana, whose astrologers advised that the child would be either a chakravartin or a buddha.

Queen Maya's dream, which is popular in early periods, always shows Maya lying on a bed, usually with her head on the right, so that her right hand side is uppermost. The elephant, not to scale, hovers above her, in Gandhara usually surrounded by a circular halo. His trunk may reach down to touch her sides. Maids and deities may stand around the bed.

=== Birth of the Buddha ===
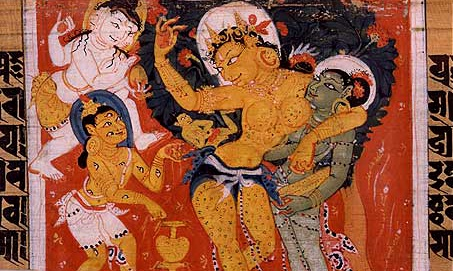
Birth of the Buddha from a Nalanda manuscript, 8th to 12th-century

The first of the Four and the Eight Great Events, and one of the most common scenes, although not appearing in the very early Indian stupas. Queen Maya, mother of the Buddha, was returning to her parents' home to give birth. She stopped for a walk in the park or grove at Lumbini, now in Nepal. Reaching up to hold a bough of a sal tree (Shorea robusta), labour began. Maya standing with her right hand over her head, holding a curving bough, is the indispensable part of the iconography; this was a pose familiar in Indian art, often adopted by yakshini tree-spirits. Maya's feet are usually crossed, giving a graceful tribhanga pose. The Buddha emerged miraculously from her side, which is usually shown in small depictions with him as though flying. In larger ones two male figures stand to the left, representing the Vedic gods Indra, who reaches out to hold the baby, and Brahma standing behind him. Maya's sister Pajapati may support her to the right, and maids may stand on the right, and apsaras or other spirits hover above.

The Buddha was able to stand and take seven steps almost immediately, a lotus flower springing up where each step went, and the baby standing on the final lotus may be shown, often in addition to him emerging from his mother's side. He raises his right hand towards heaven and declares "I alone am honoured in heaven and on earth. This triple world is full of sufferings; I will be the saviour from these sufferings".

In East Asia this subject became popular by itself, the most famous and one of the earliest at the Todaiji in Nara, Japan. Buddha's first bath is also sometimes shown in the same scene; two Nagaraja (Nāga kings) perform the bathing, and maids may attend. Symbolic re-enactments of this form part of the rituals celebrating Buddha's Birthday or Vesak in many countries.

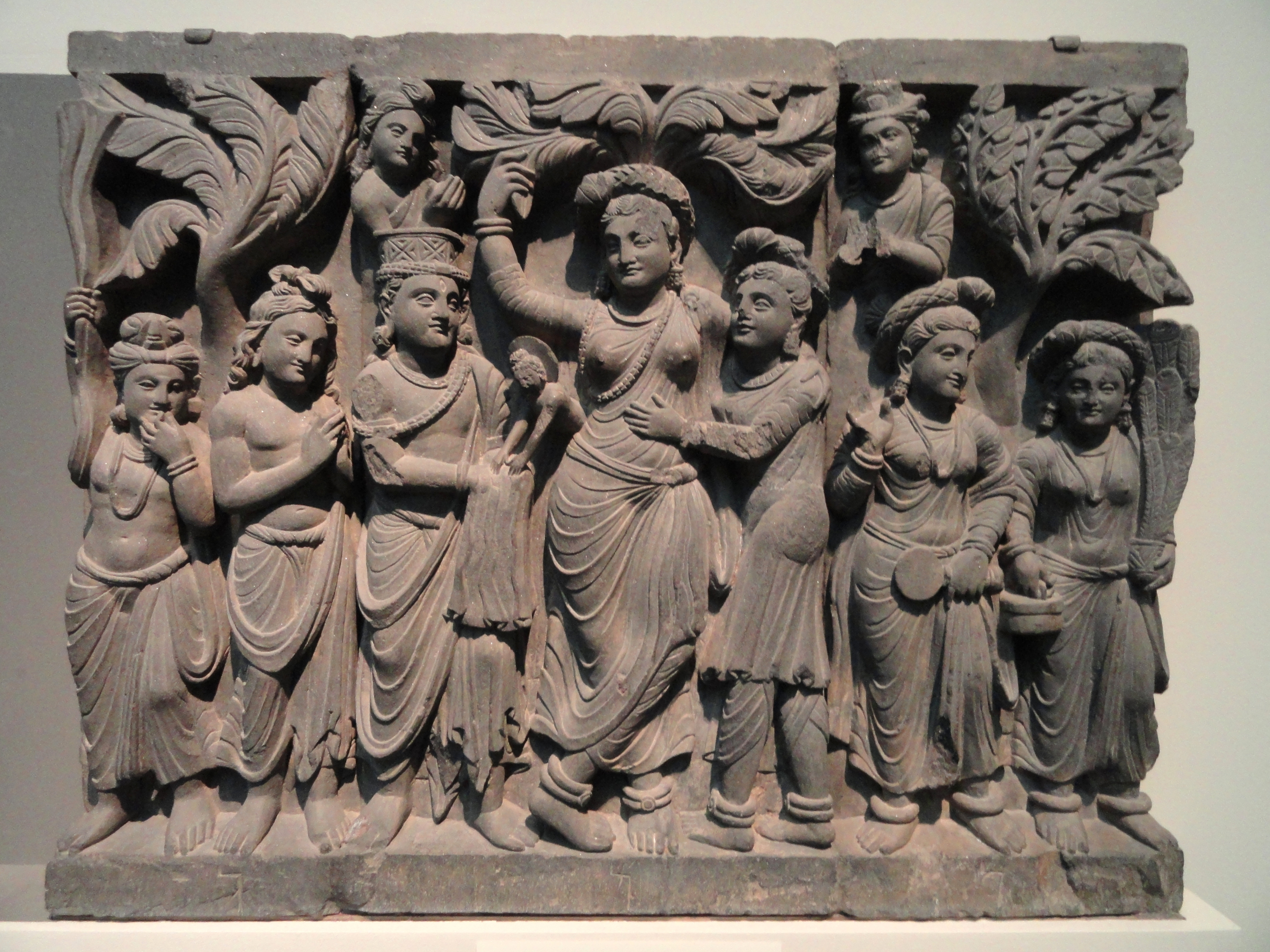
Kushan dynasty, Gandhara. At right two female Nāgas stand ready for the bath.

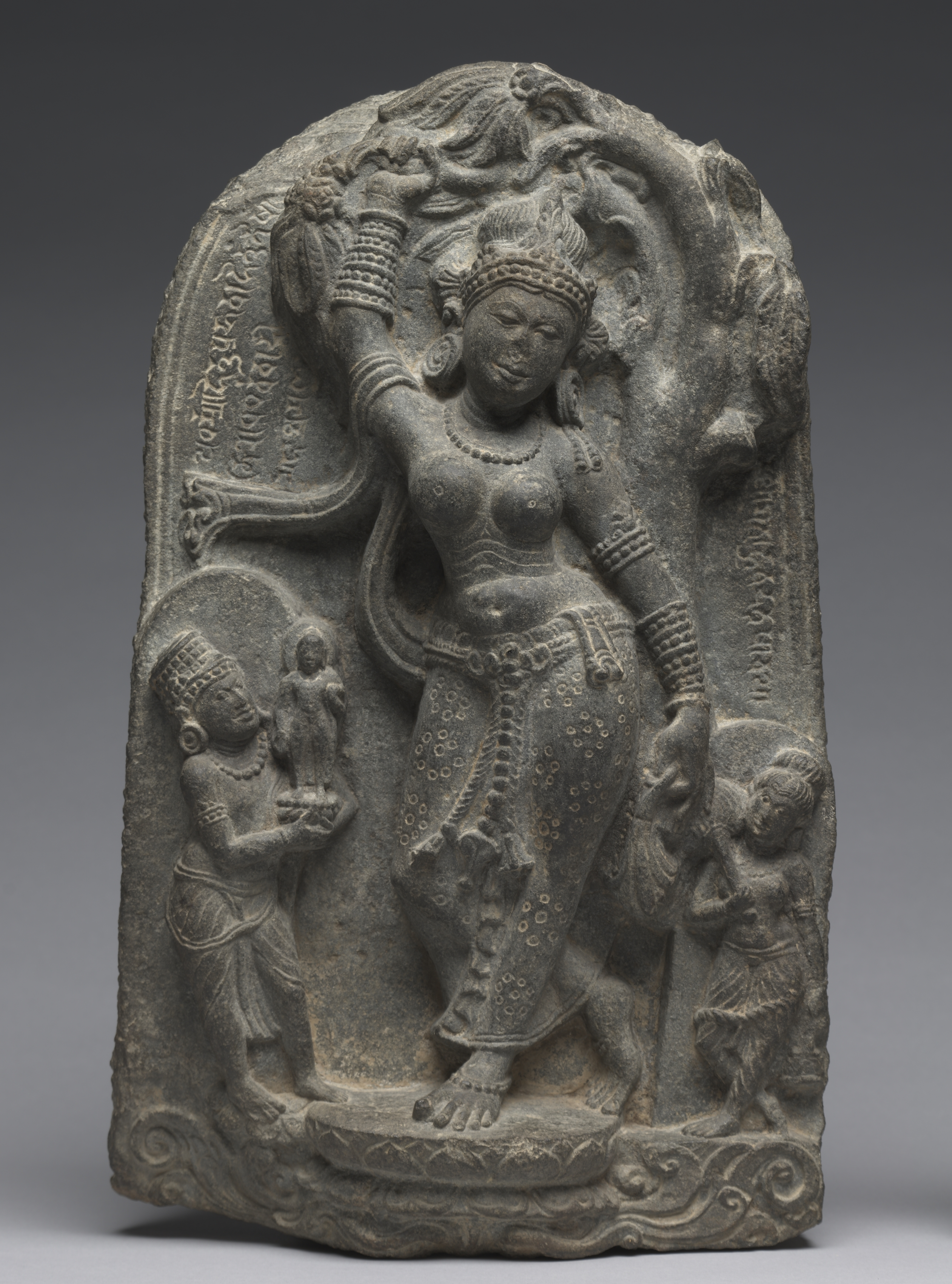
Pala Empire, c. 800. Indra holds the standing baby at left.

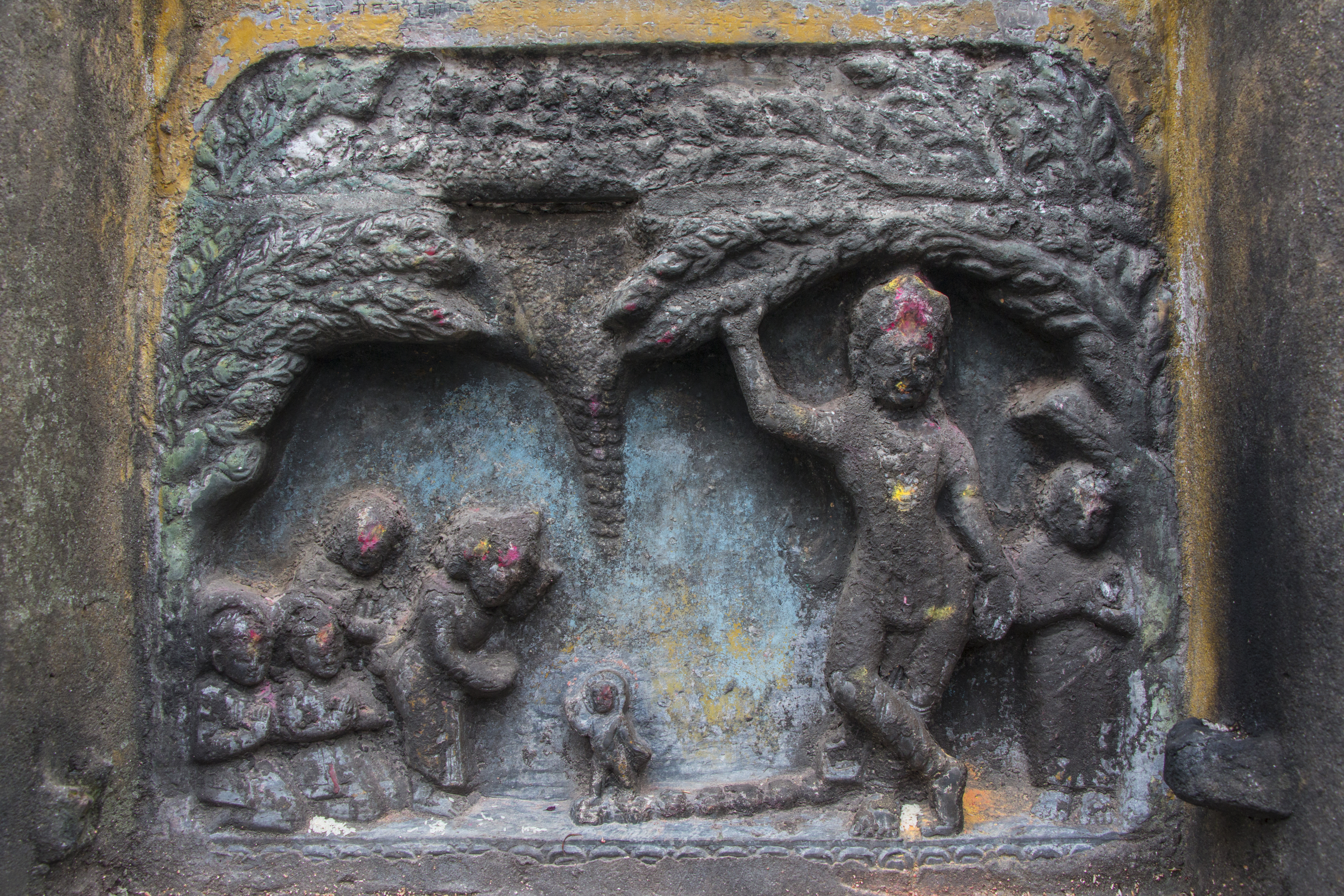
Seven Steps, Kathmandu, Nepal

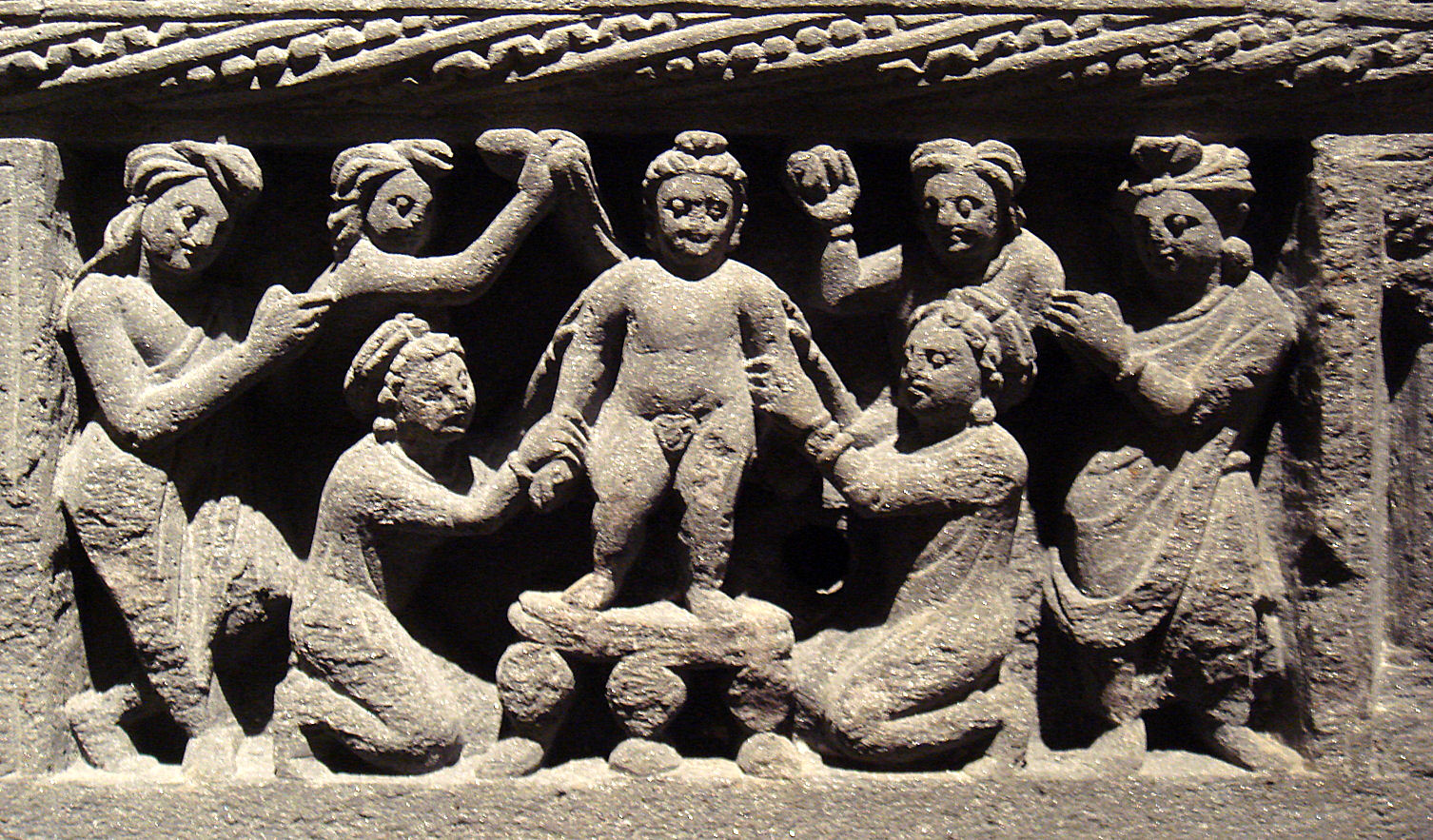
Buddha's first bath. Gandhara, 2nd century

=== Meeting with Asita ===
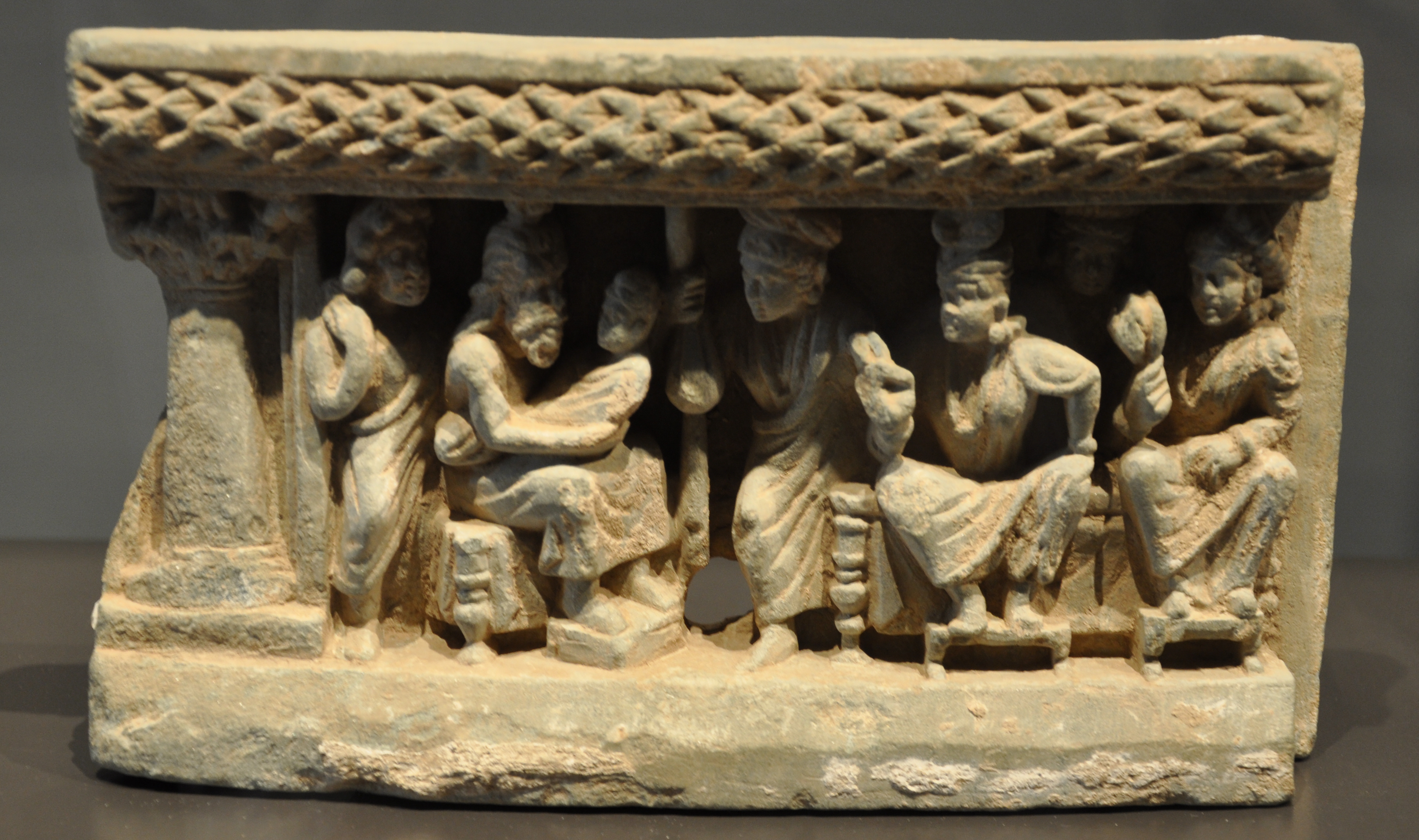
The Prophecy of Asita, Gandhara, 3rd/4th century

Asita was a wise man who had been the king's guru, but had retired to the forest. In some versions he had been the chief interpreter of Queen Maya's dream. Hearing of the birth, he went to the palace, accompanied by his nephew Nalaka (later a follower of the Buddha), and recognised the "Thirty-two Characteristics of a Great Man" (Skt. mahāpuruṣa lakṣaṇa). He prophesied that the baby would grow up to be a buddha, then began to weep. Asked why by the king, he said he regretted that he would not live long enough to hear Siddharta's teachings. In Gandharan depictions and at Amaravarti Stupa, the sage may hold the baby on his knees, while at Borobudor he sits in his father's lap. Especially in South East Asia, the baby may place his foot on Asita's head.

Soon after his birth, the king proposed following custom and visiting the city's temple to present the new-born to the gods. Siddharta, already able to speak, objected but in the end went. When the group arrived at the temple, the statues of the gods stepped down and prostrated themselves before Siddharta. This episode is depicted at Borobudor.

=== Childhood of Siddharta ===
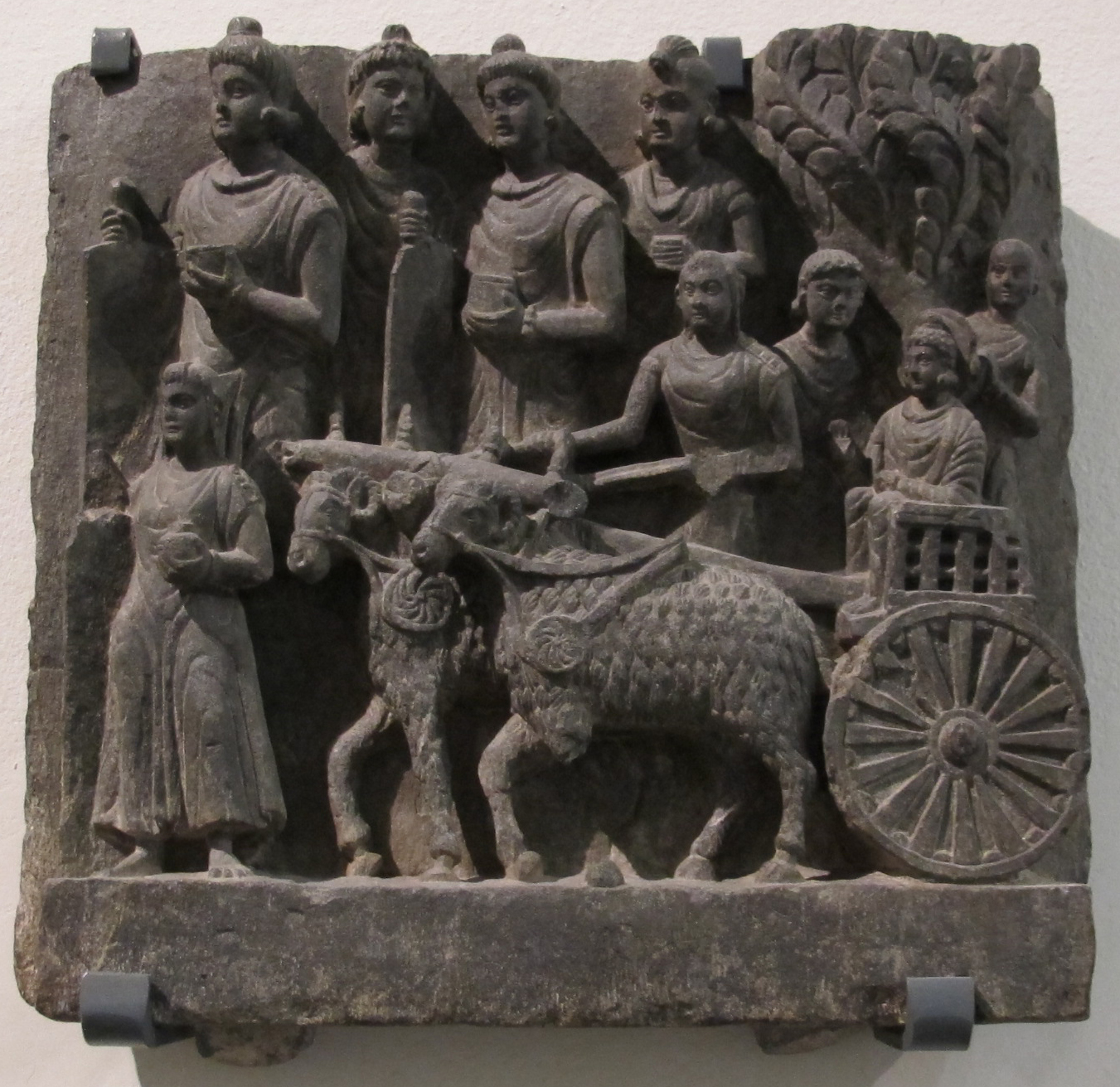
Siddharta driven to school in a cart, Gandharan

==== Education ====
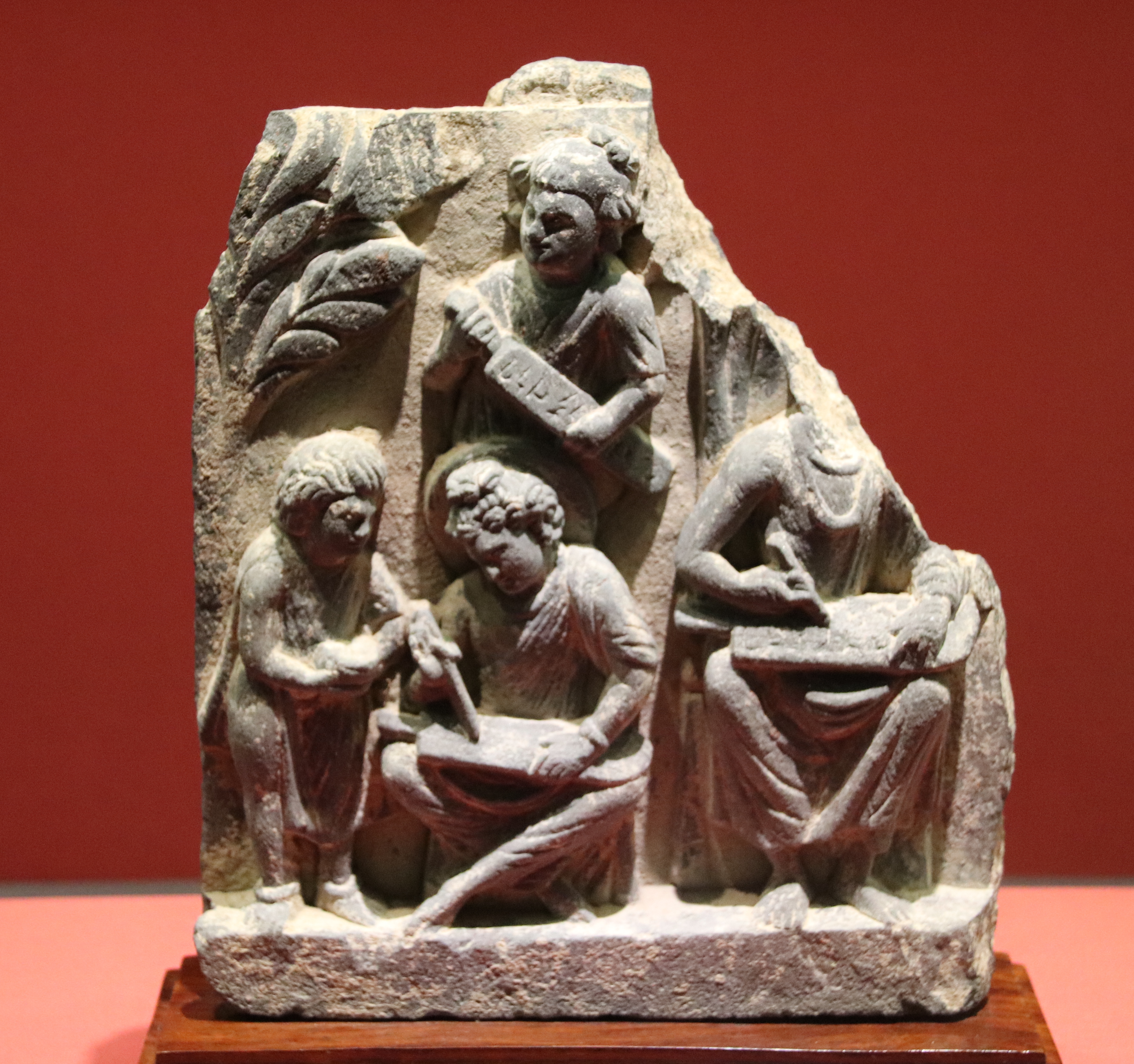
Siddharta studying, Gandharan

There are rare depictions of Siddharta astounding his teachers as a boy, or winning games or sporting contests with other boys by magical means. He received a princely education, and scenes of him learning martial arts, riding, archery and swimming may be found in extended cycles, as in two early Tibetan thankas. Some Gandharan reliefs show him being driven to school in a small cart pulled by rams, perhaps reflecting local elite life; this detail is not in surviving early texts.

In India, depictions reflect the emphasis in the texts on the high standards in physical princely skills expected by Siddharta's intended father-in-law. An archery contest, naturally won by Siddharta, is sometimes depicted in Gandhara. East Asian depictions place more emphasis on desk work, no doubt reflecting the local importance of passing the Imperial examinations of China, which began around the 6th century. In a 9th-century painted banner from the Mogao Caves, Siddharta actually appears to be taking such an examination.

=== Meditation under the jambu tree ===
While still a boy, Siddharta was taken to witness his father leading a royal ploughing ceremony, a common royal duty in Asia (in Japan the Emperor still plants and later harvests rice on a special plot). He was struck by the efforts of the men, and birds catching insects in the air. Wandering away from the crowd, he sat under a jambu tree and began to meditate on this.

== Married life ==
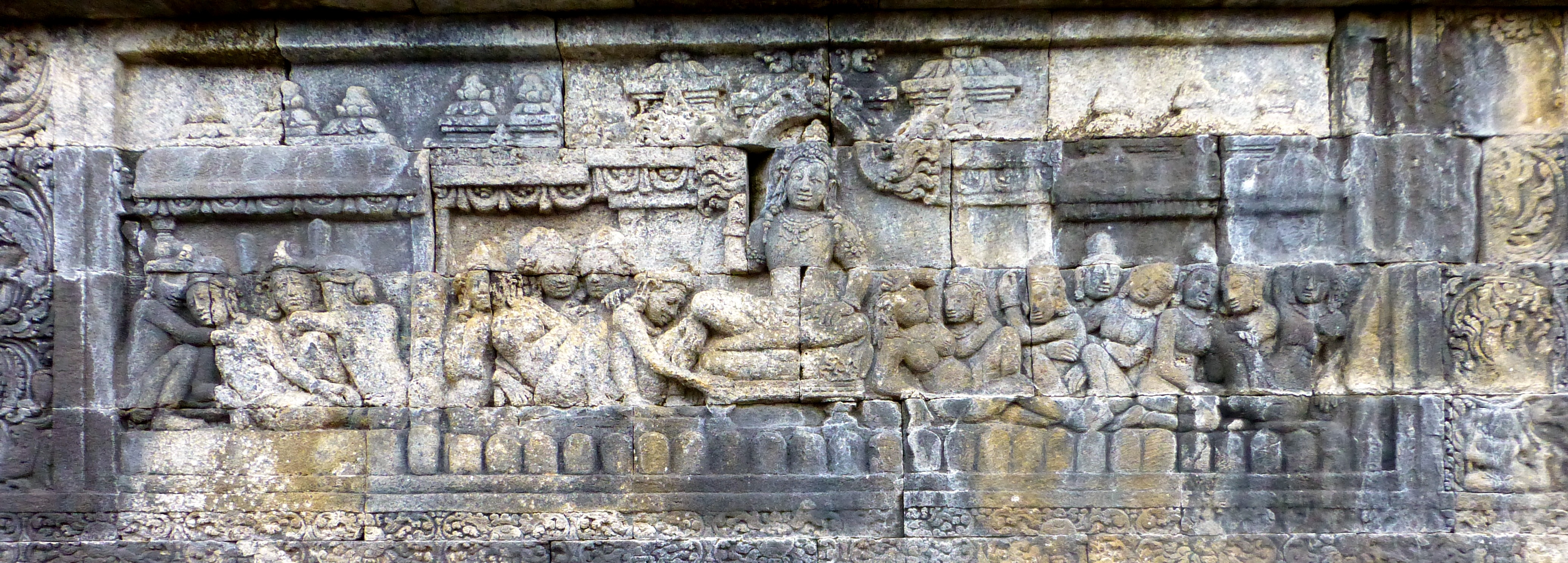
Borobudor, Lalitavistara reliefs (panel 63) Siddhartha is appalled by the attitudes of the Sleeping Women

Siddharta married Yaśodharā, when both were 16. The wedding is sometimes shown in art, as are contented scenes of the couple together. After some twelve years they had a son, Rāhula, who was born the day that Siddharta left the palace for good. Siddharta's thoughts had increasingly turned to his spiritual life, especially after he saw the Four Sights (below). His father wished him to take the secular path, from the prophetic options offered before his birth, but a visit by a delegation of gods, urged him to pursue the life of dharma. This is sometimes shown in art, for example at Borobudor.

The biographies record a moment when Siddharta was repulsed by the appearance of his female retinue, one or more of whom were sprawled on the floor asleep, concluding "It is true, I live amid a cemetery". In Gandhara the scene (sometimes titled "Life in the Palace") is represented by Siddharta rising from a couch on which his wife lies, looking down at a female figure on the floor below. At Borobudor there is a much larger group of figures sprawled on the floor, which immediately precedes the Great Departure scenes.

=== The Four Sights ===
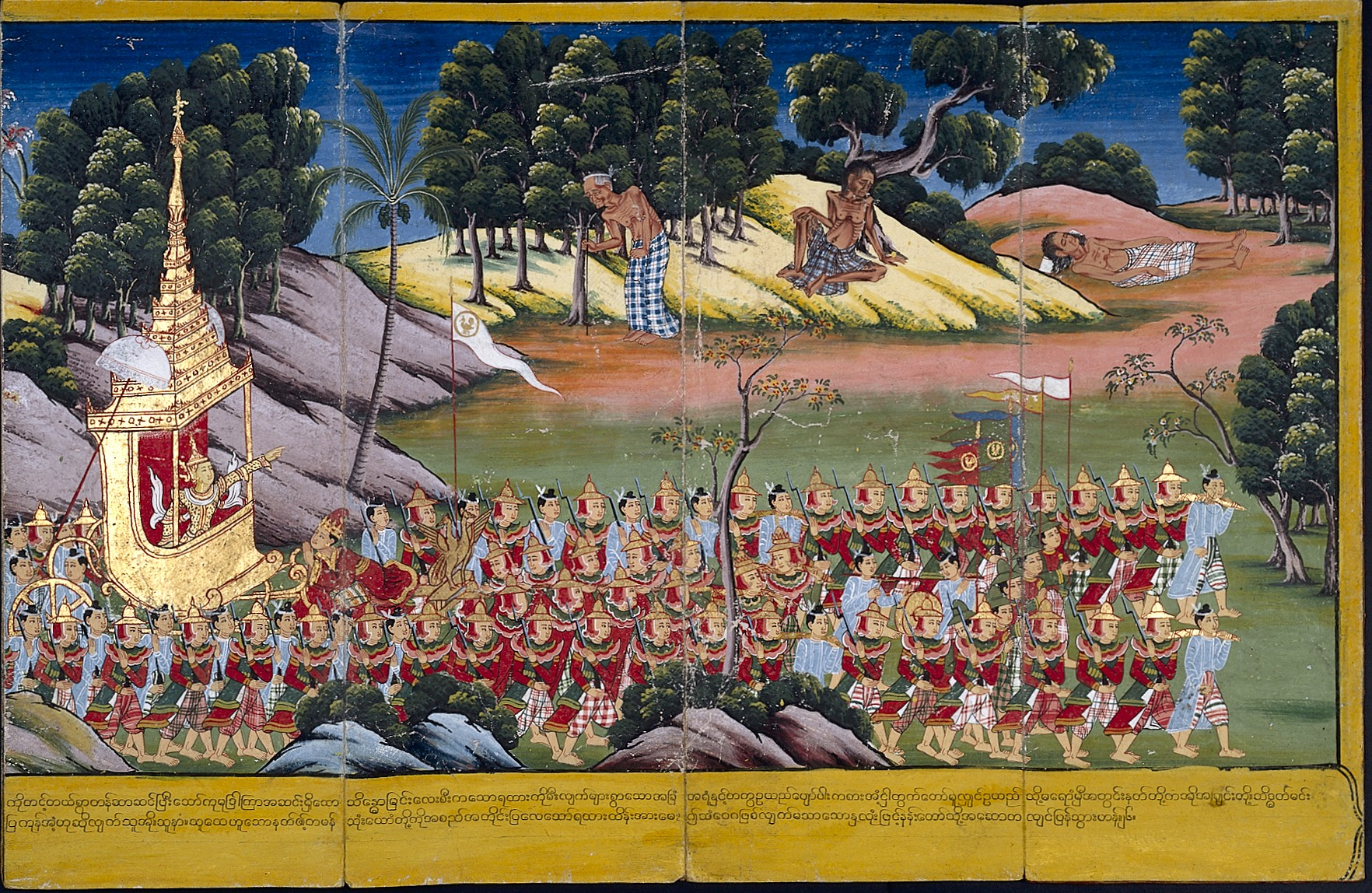
Siddharta sees the first three sights, 19th-century Burmese manuscript

Living a life of luxury, Siddharta's parents took care to shield him from unpleasant aspects of the world, but one day, riding through the countryside with his servant Channa, he saw the "four sights", firstly of a very old man, a very sick man, and a corpse. On a further trip he saw a mendicant monk or ascetic, whose tranquil bearing impressed him. These turned his thoughts to a more spiritual life. They are not very often represented in Indian art, perhaps surprisingly, but are covered at Borobudor in four panels, and in more modern paintings.

== Life after the palace ==
=== The Great Departure ===
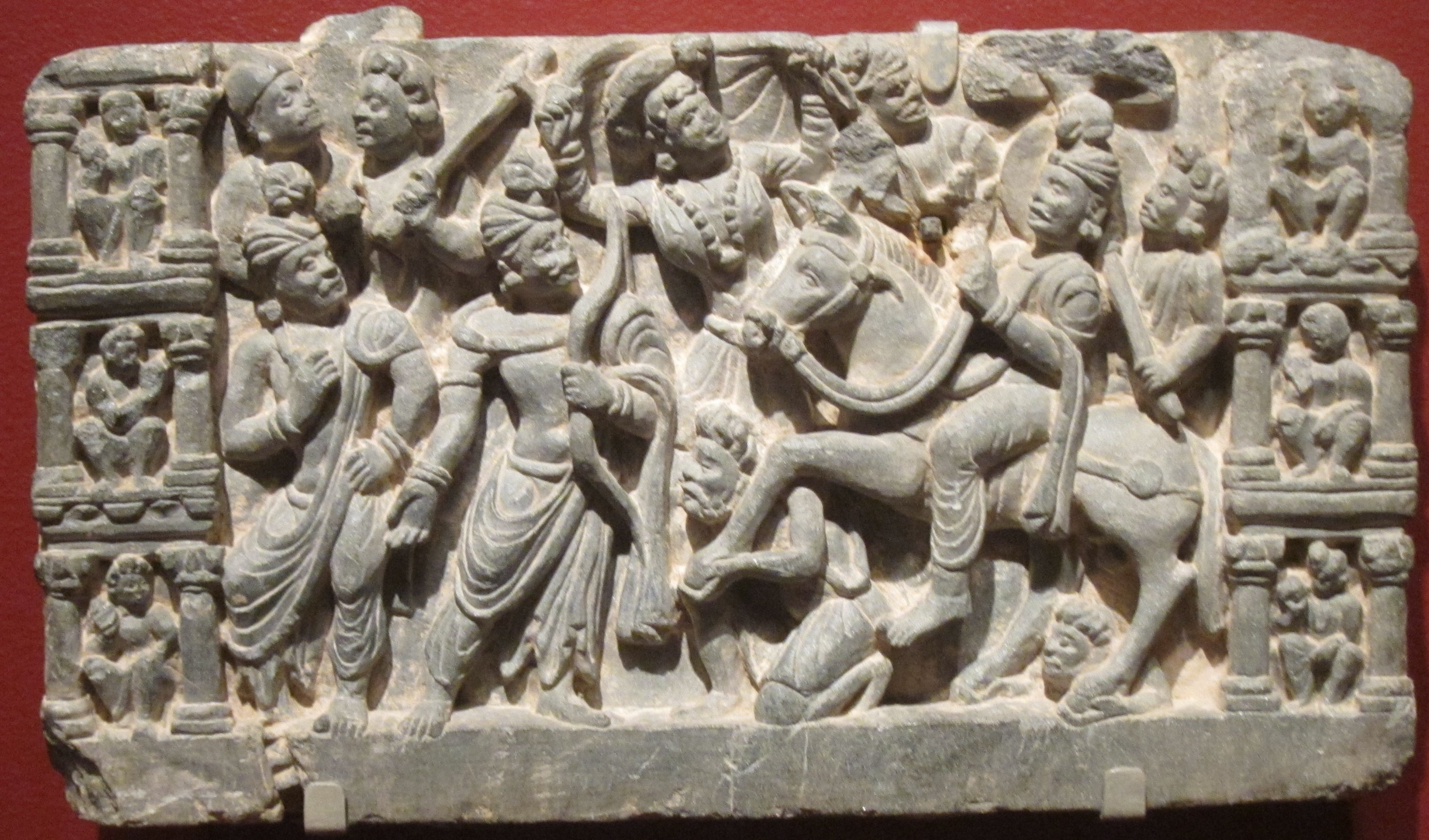
A typical Gandharan scene of The Great Departure. Two gods crouch down to hold Kanthaka's hoofs, and others watch on the left. To the right of Siddharta, Channa holds a parasol over him; to the left, the bowman.

The birth of his son, fulfilling his duty to provide an heir for the royal line, was apparently the trigger for Siddharta's abandonment of palace life to become an ascetic. At midnight he told his servant Channa to bring his favourite horse Kanthaka. There are rare scenes of him saying goodbye to his sleeping wife and child, but much the most common scene is Siddharta leaving the city on horseback, known as the Great Renunciation or Great Departure; after his birth, this is the most common narrative episode in Gandharan art.

Siddharta is dressed in his princely finery, for the last time. In most accounts gods (or ganas) muffled Kanthaka's hoofs, and this is usually shown, with the gods under the horse, holding his feet in the hands. The other figures often shown at the sides, especially on the left, are gods and other supernatural beings, who had gathered to witness the event. In Gandhara there is often, immediately to Siddharta's left, a rather mysterious figure carrying a bow, often in armour, who may be a guide or protector. In some reliefs Siddharta rides straight towards the viewer, the front of his horse projecting out beyond the main plane of the relief.

Once well away from the palace, Siddharta sent Channa back to explain to his family, taking the prince's clothes; sometimes this makes a scene. Kanthaka is said to have died of grief soon after. In some accounts, he threw his turban high in the air, where it was caught by heavenly beings and carried up to heaven, where it was worshipped as a relic. This is sometimes shown, especially by the Amaravati school.

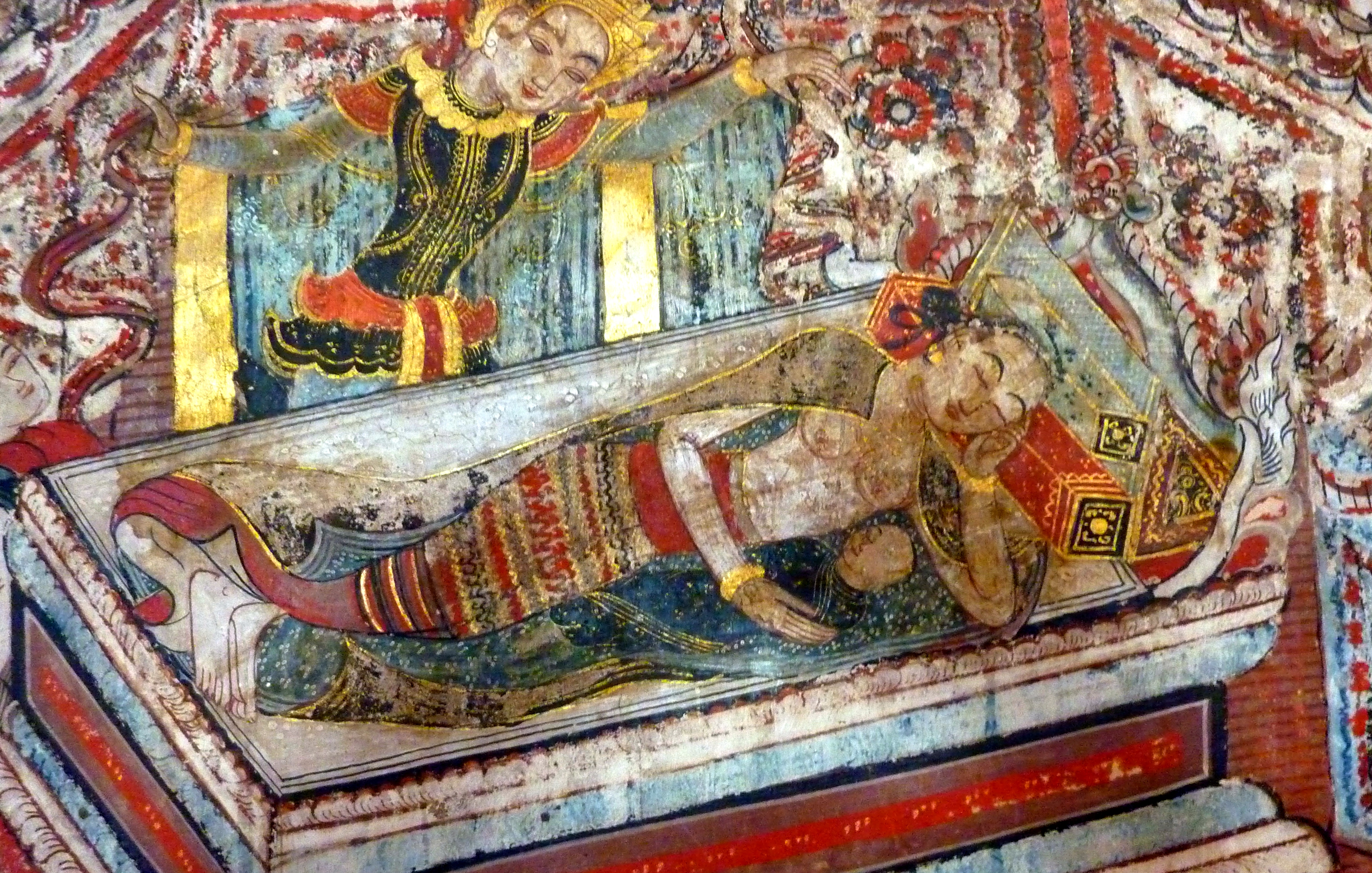
Detail of Siddharta looking in at his sleeping wife and child before leaving. Thai mural.

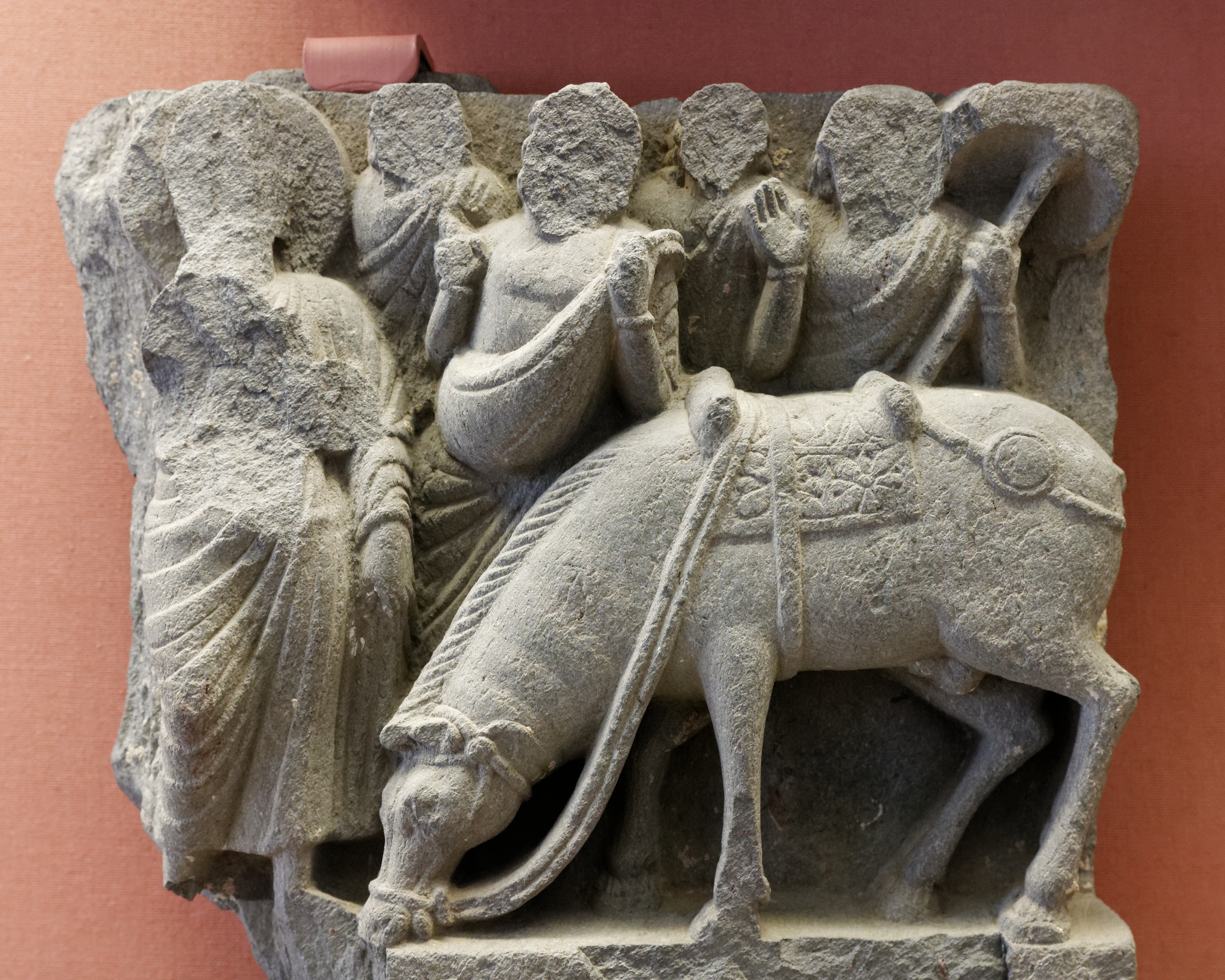
Siddharta parting from Kanthaka and Channa

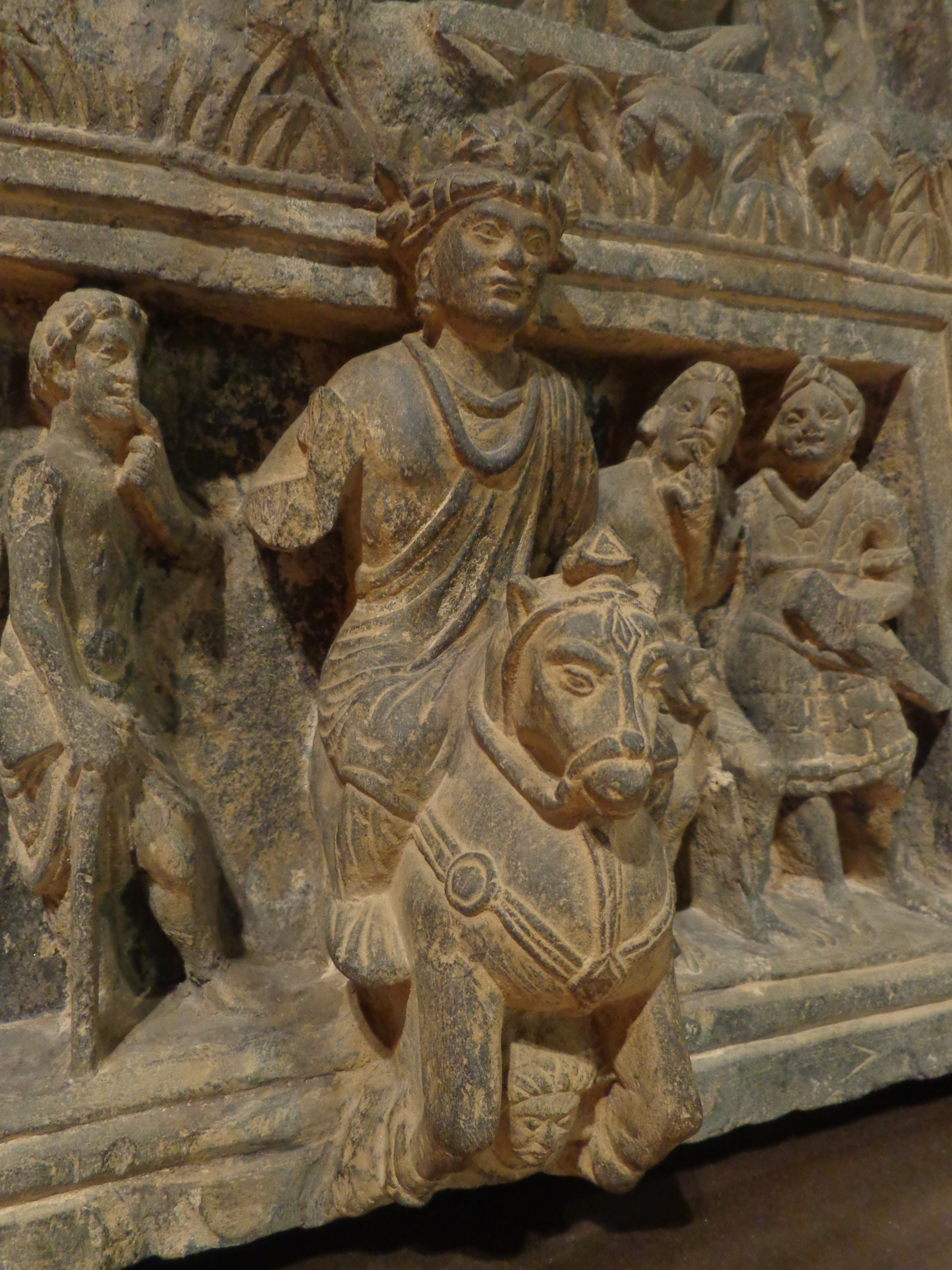
Detail; Siddharta rides out of the main plane of the relief, Gandhara

=== Cutting off hair ===
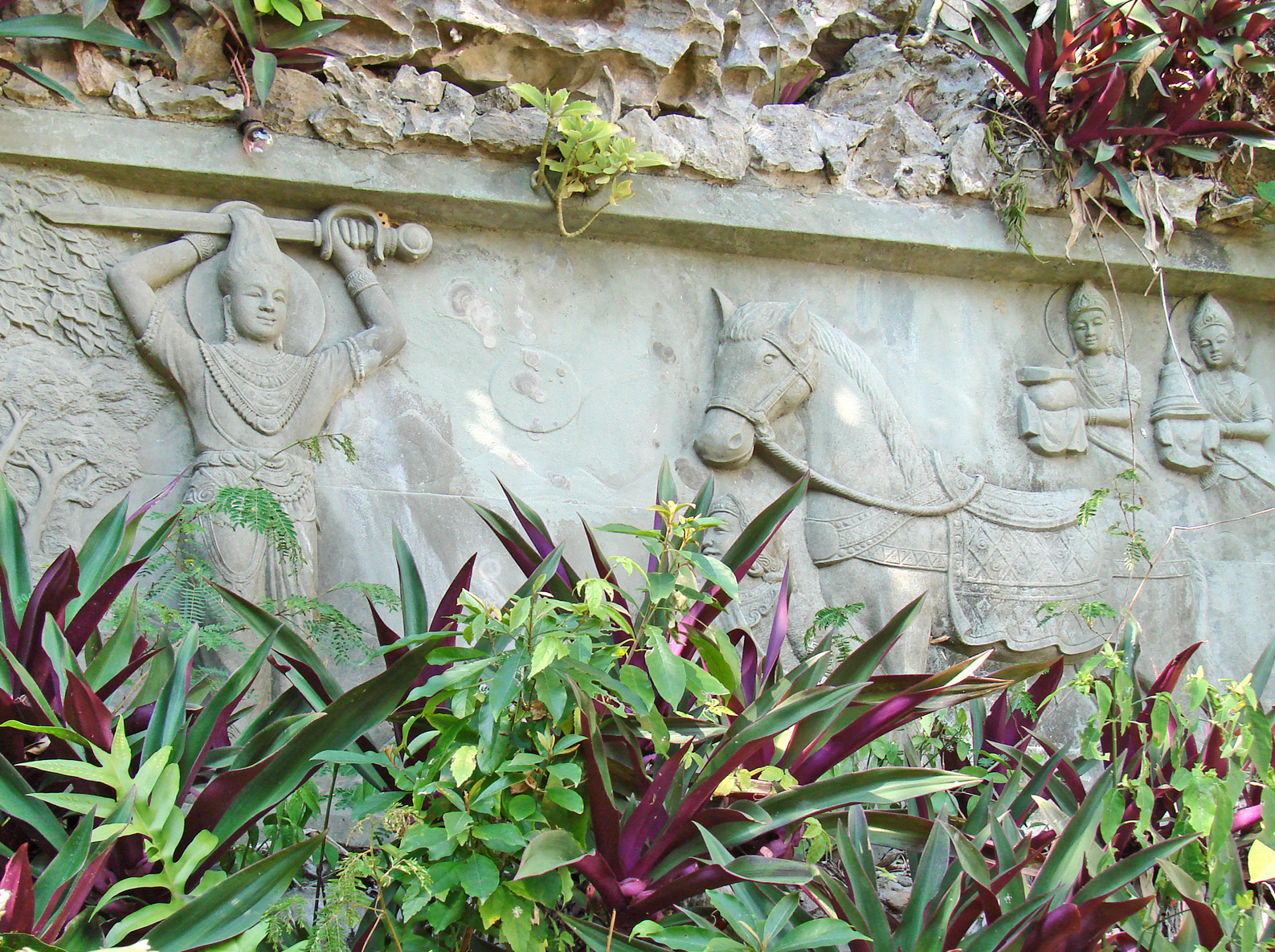
Cutting the hair, modern relief at the Marble Mountains in Vietnam

Siddharta then cut off his hair, which may make a scene. This has remained a popular scene in South-East Asian cycles; it reflects directly the experience of modern monks. Like his turban, the hair is taken as a relic to the Trayastrimsa Heaven, and panels at Bharhut and Sanchi show it being worshiped as a relic.

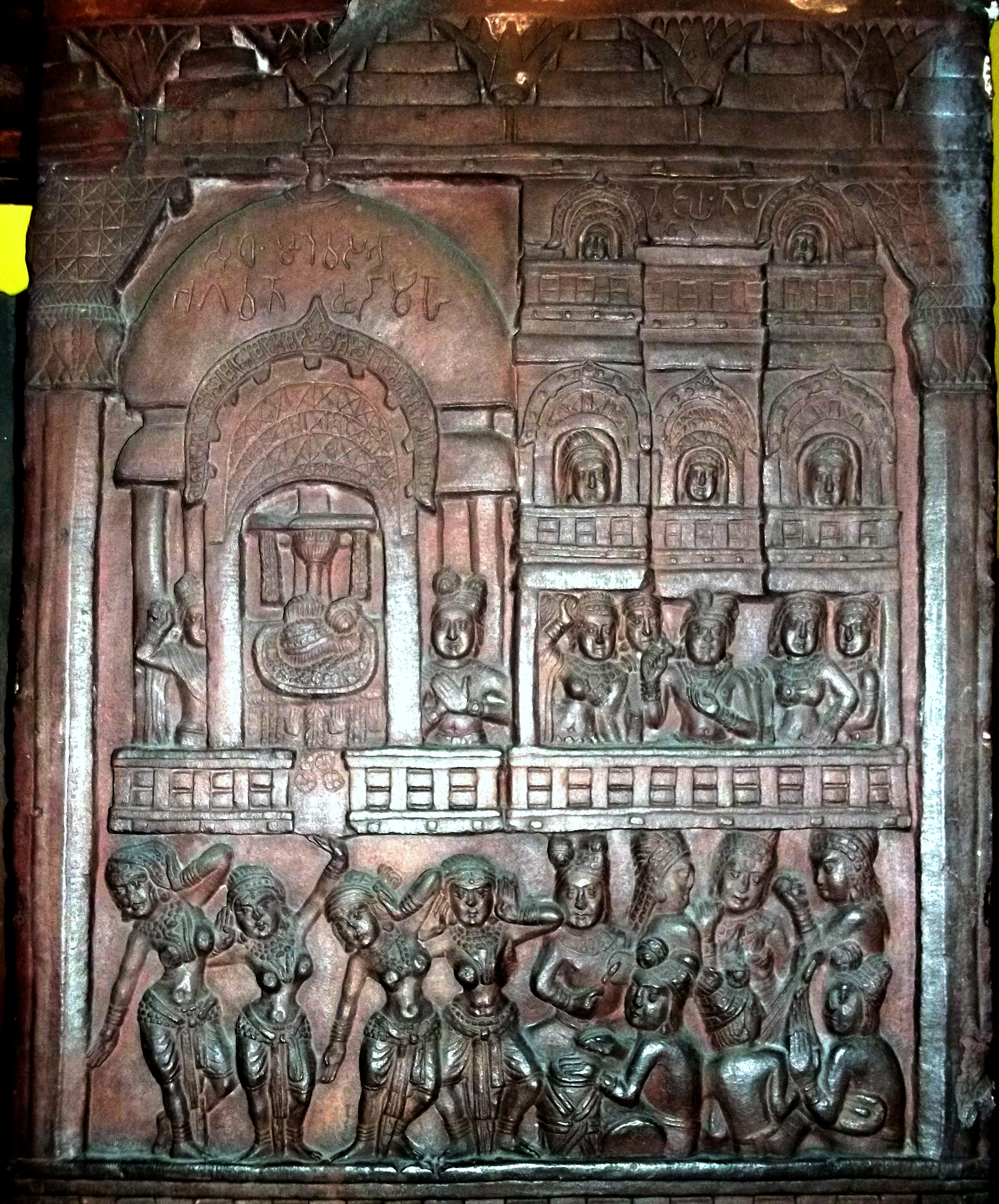
Worship of the Bodhisattva's hair in the Trayastrimsa heaven. Bharhut, 1st century BC

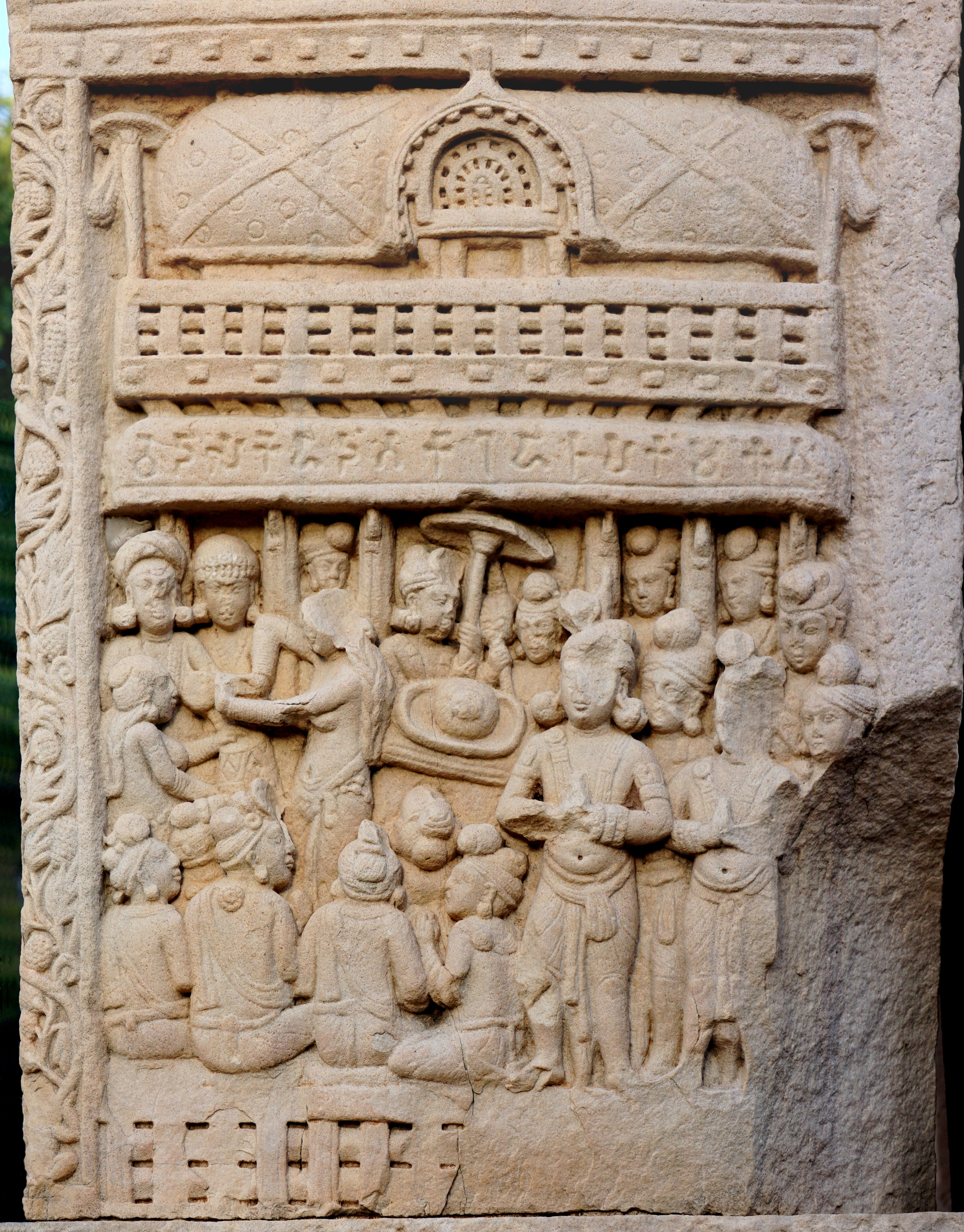
Worship of Siddhartha's hair in the Trayastrimsa heaven. Sanchi, 1st century AD

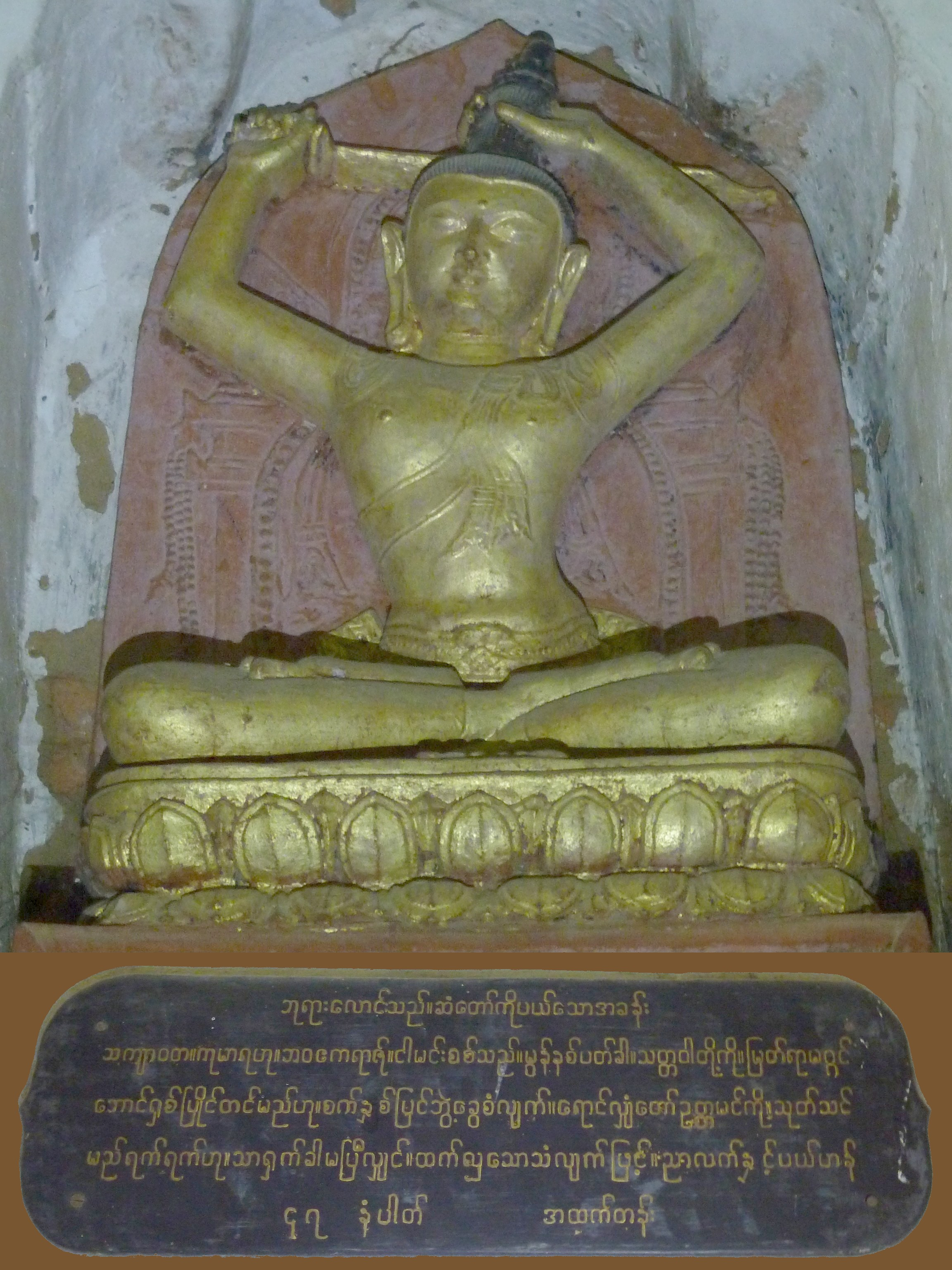
Siddhartha cutting his hair, Ananda, Bagan

=== Austerities ===
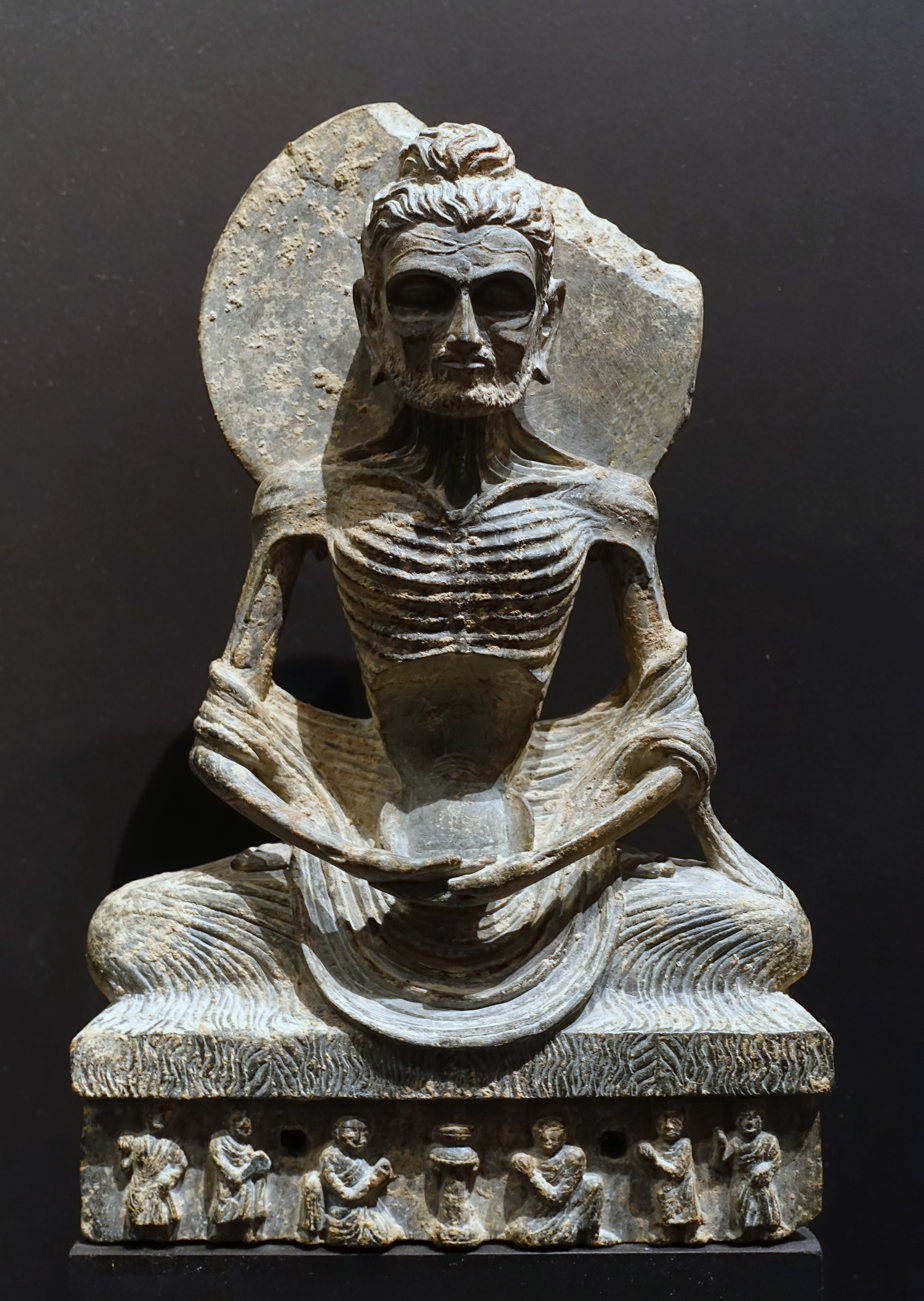
The fasting Buddha, receiving the gift of Sujata in the bottom relief, Gandhara, 2nd century

Siddharta then embarked on a period as a wandering ascetic, according to many accounts studying under two gurus before leaving them, firstly Āḷāra Kālāma, then Uddaka Rāmaputta. He tried living extremely austerely, fasting with great rigour. Images of the Fasting Buddha, visibly malnourished, appear at various points in Buddhist art, but are absent at other times and places. They are typically single figures, in a meditating posture. There are a number from Gandhara, but few from South Asia thereafter. They then appear in China and more recently South-East Asia.

The end of Siddharta's period of extreme austerity is represented by a number of different incidents in the biographies. Various people ask him to stop, with some offering him food, and clothes. The Lalitavistara Sūtra recounts visits by both Queen Maya and a delegation of gods, both begging Siddharta to abandon this extreme approach. Each of these receives a panel at Borobudor (two for the visit of the gods), as well as one of Siddharta and the five companions he had acquired. In these Siddharta's body shows much less sign of starvation compared to Gandharan images.

A number of encounters with ordinary people may also be shown, such as the Offering of milk rice by Sujata, a village girl he encounters. This is said to be the last sustenance he took before his Enlightenment. This is represented at Cave 11 at Ajanta, with a small Sujata kneeling on the base of a Buddha statue. It has a panel at Borobudor, and is often shown in modern South-East Asian painted cycles.

The last of these before the Enlightenment was when Siddharta met a grass-cutter and obtained from him long kusa grass (desmostachya bipinnata) to sit on as he meditated (of a type often used by Indian religious for this purpose). This encounter may be shown, with examples from both Gandhara and modern South-East Asia.

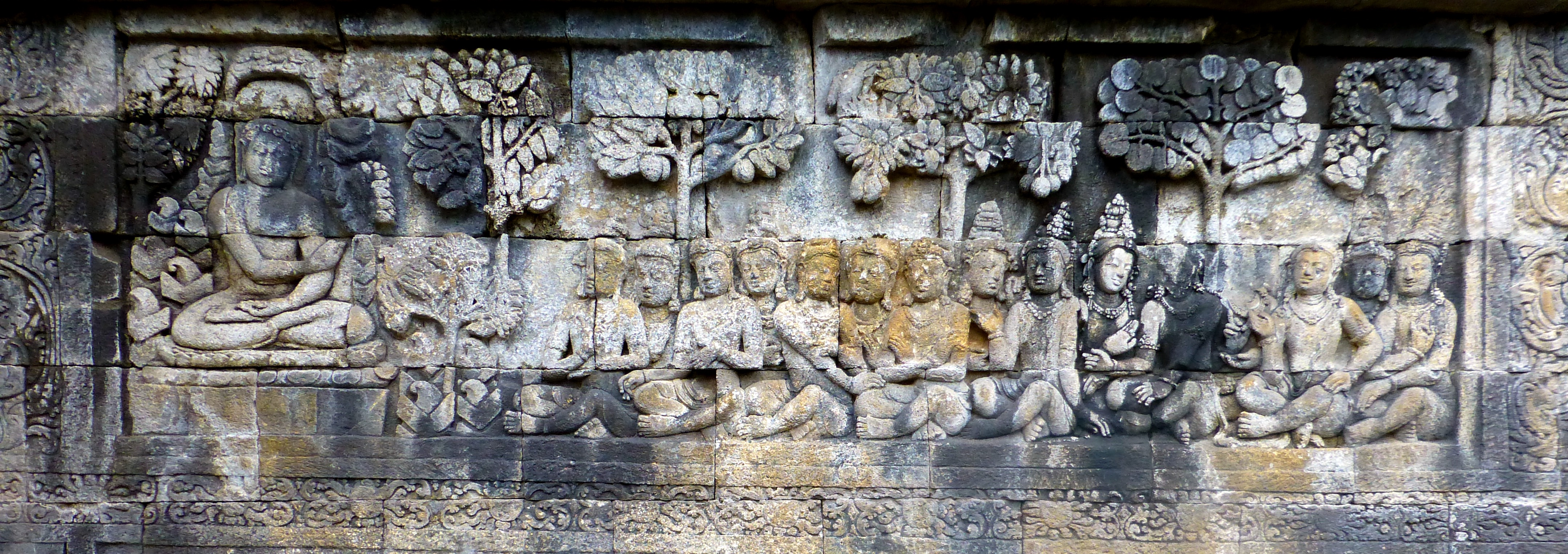
Borobudur, The Gods beg the Bodhisattva to Eat

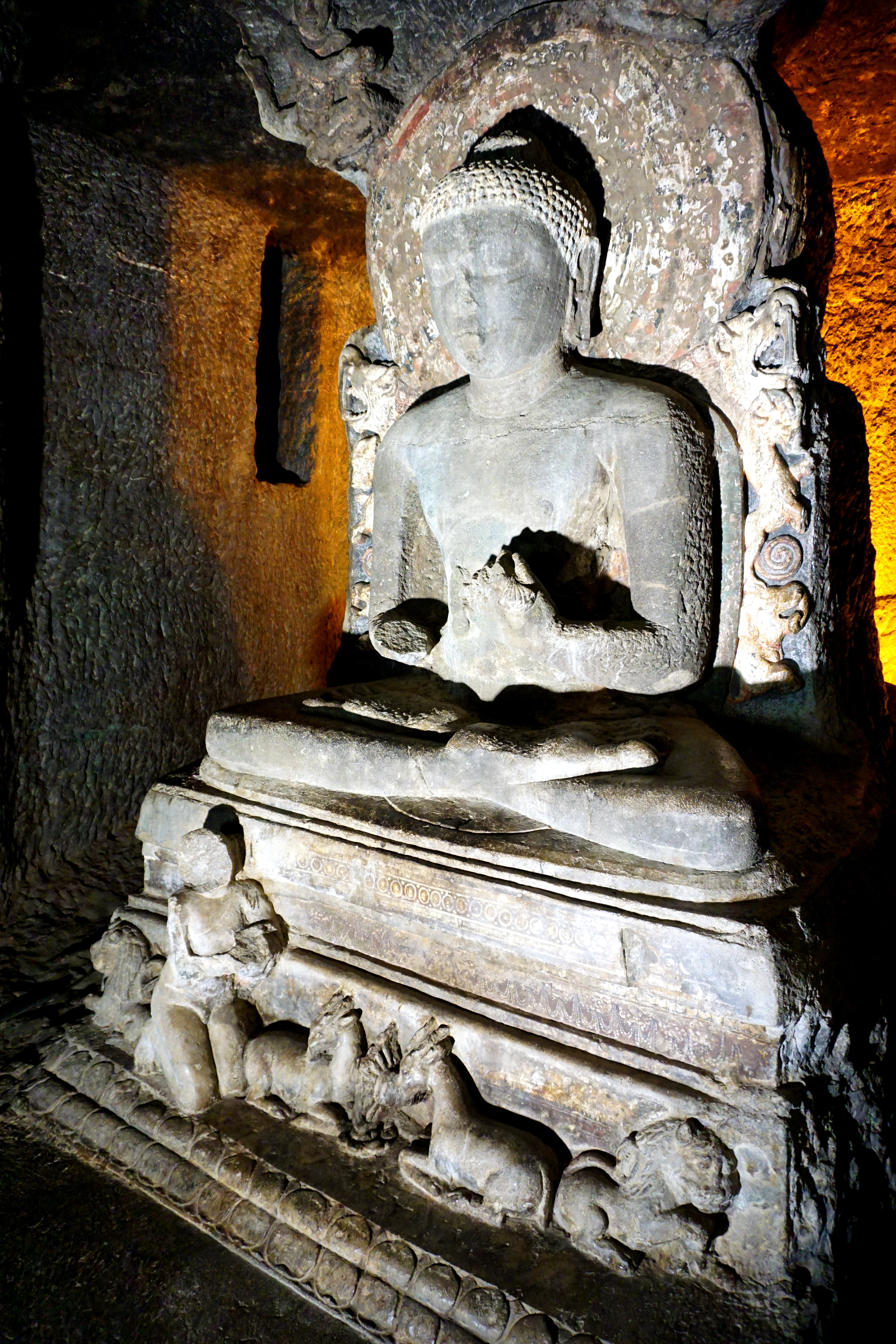
Buddha with small Sujata, Cave 11 at Ajanta

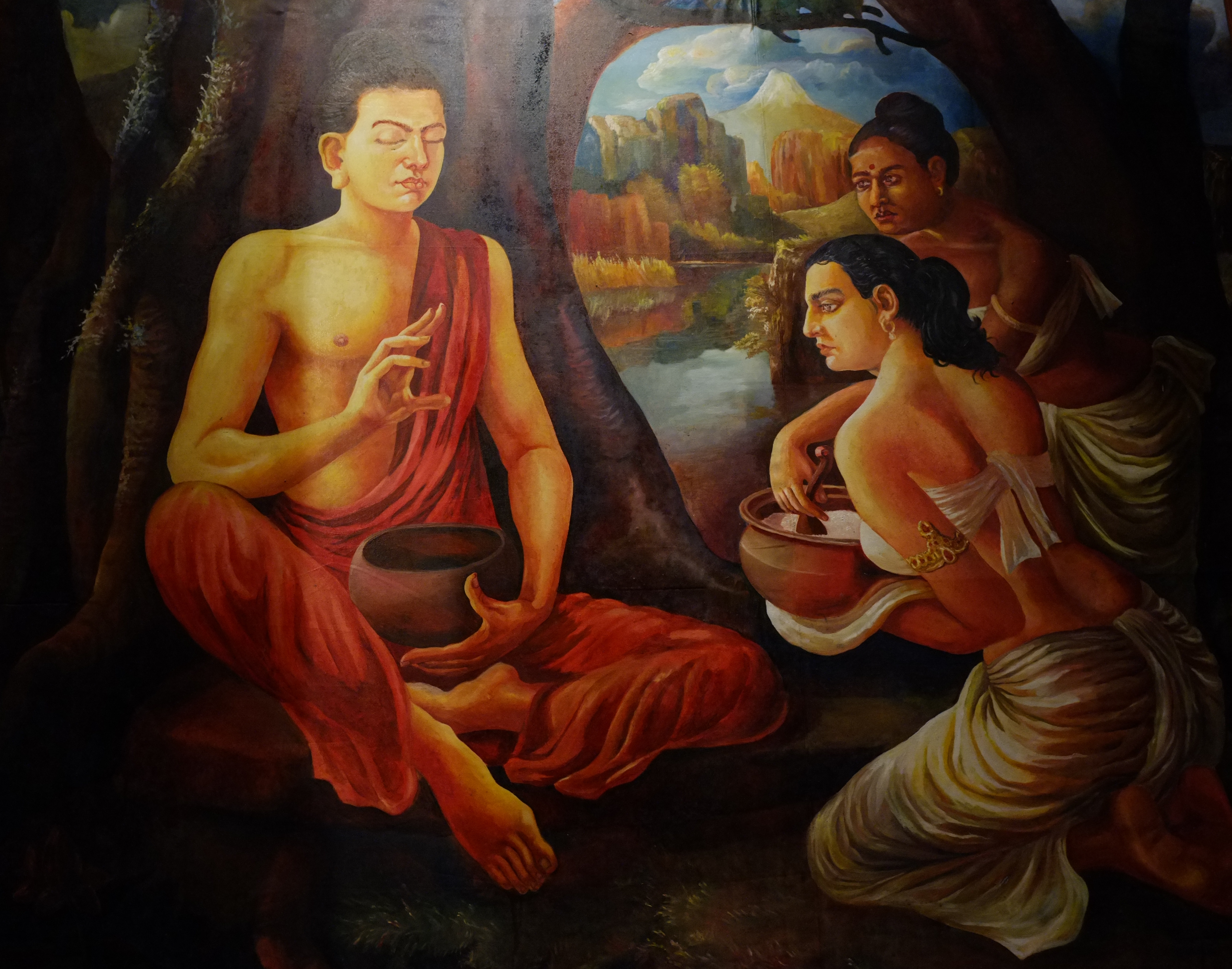
Sujata's offering, Sri Lanka, 2006

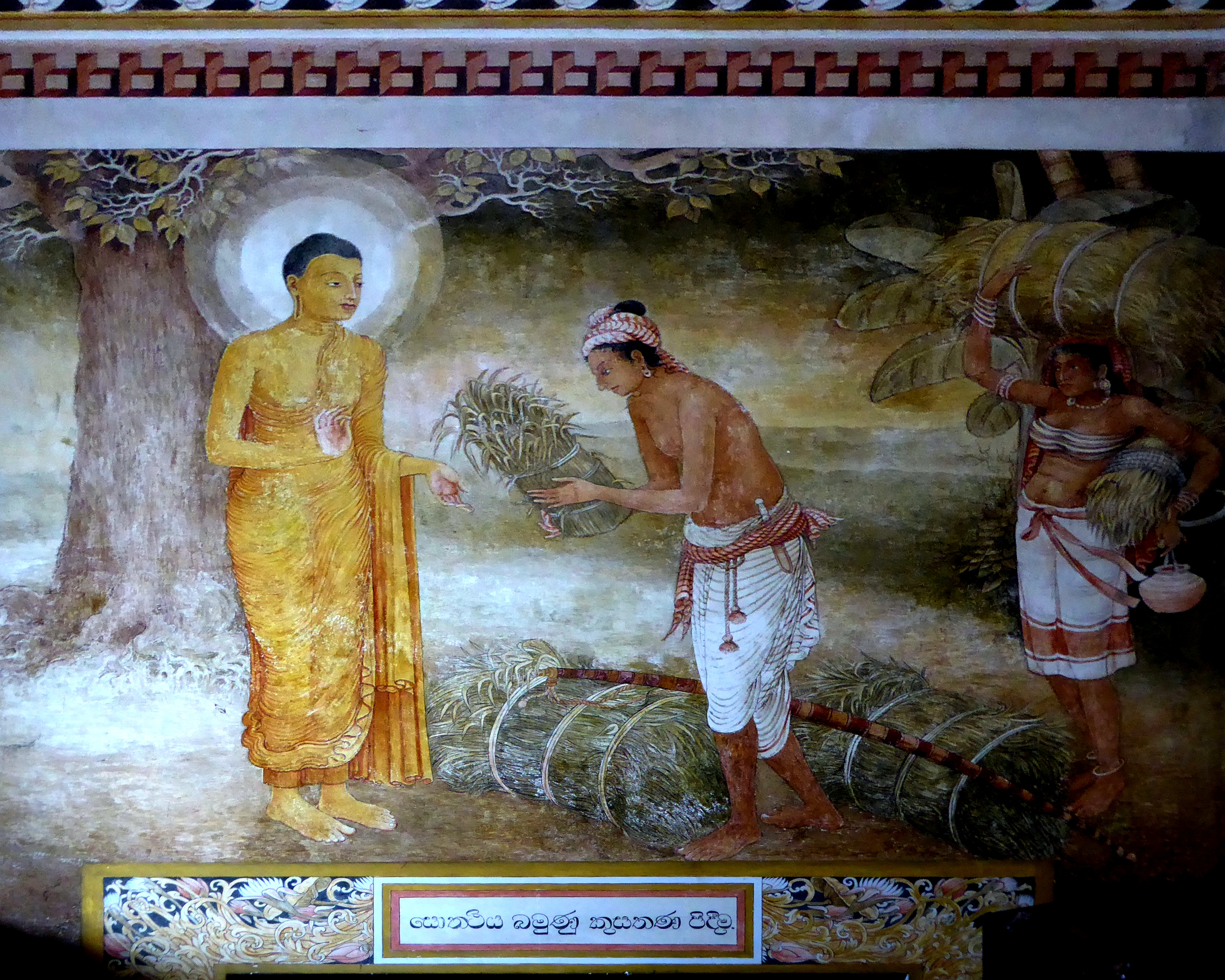
The gift of kusa grass, Sri Lanka

=== Shakyamuni Descending from the Mountain ===
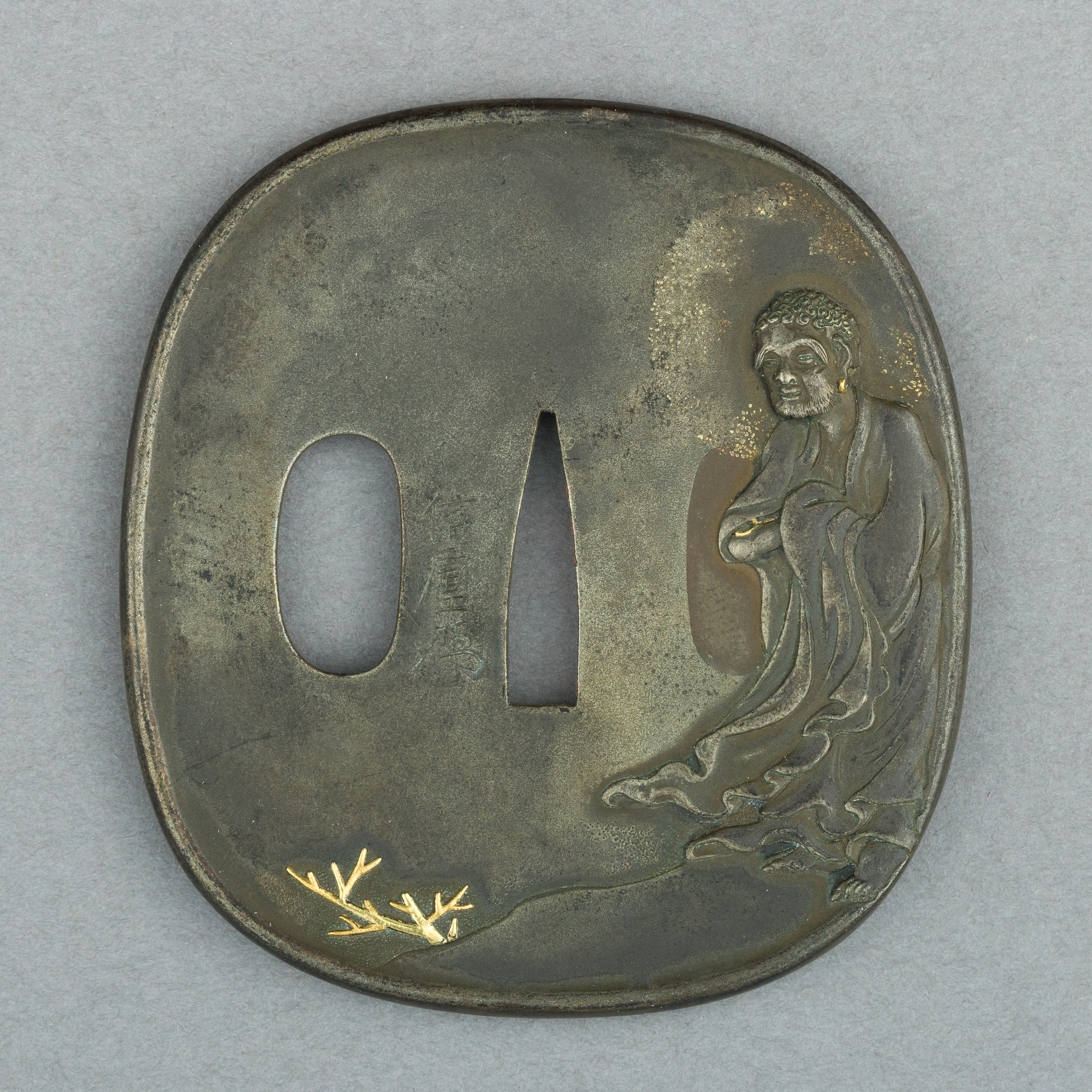
Shakyamuni Descending from the Mountain on a Japanese tsuba (sword guard), Edo Period

This, sometimes known by its Japanese name of Shussan Shaka, is a subject that appears to have arisen in 10th-century China, in Chan Buddhism, the parent of Japanese Zen Buddhism, which began in the 13th century. It is not found in Indian art. Siddharta, or Shakyamuni, is shown as a single figure, in paintings with a landscape background. The subject is not usually part of a series. He is walking down from the mountains where his austerities had been practiced; in East Asian tradition mountains are the usual location for profound meditation. He is dishevelled and often bearded, rather than looking severely malnourished. In Zen monasteries the paintings are displayed around the feast celebrating the Buddha's Enlightenment, and many Zen followers believe that the paintings show a moment after this had occurred.

== Enlightenment and after ==
=== Enlightenment of the Buddha ===
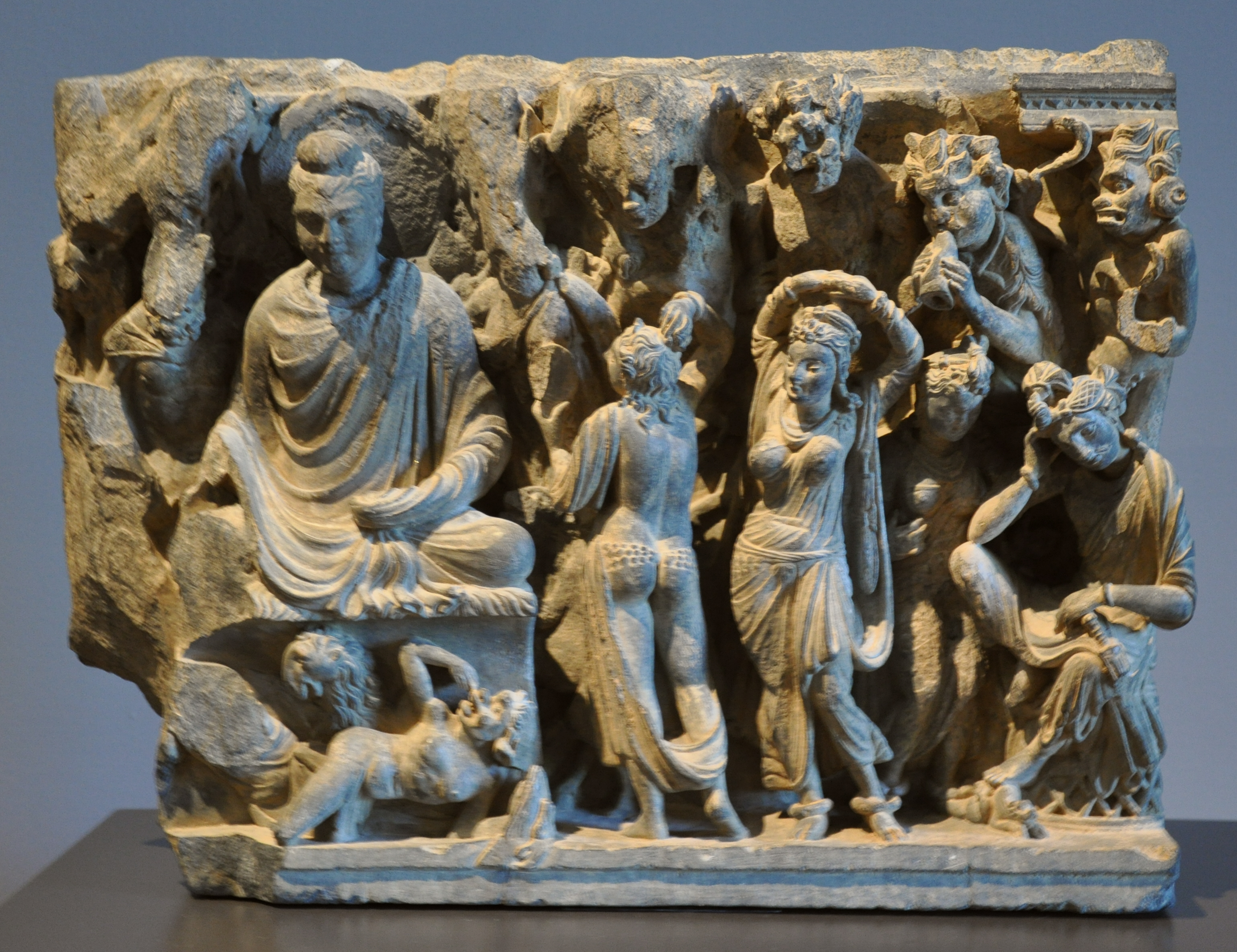
Temptations of the daughters of Mara, Gandhara

This took place at Bodh Gaya, under the famous Bodhi Tree, a probable descendent of which survives beside the Mahabodhi Temple. Buddhist tradition recounts that the enlightenment was preceded by the "assault of Mara", a demon king, who challenged the Buddha's right to acquire the powers that enlightenment brought, and asked him for a witness to attest his right to achieve it. In reply Buddha touched the ground with his right hand outstretched, asking Pṛthivi, the devi of the earth, to witness his enlightenment, which she did.

The foliage of the Bodhi Tree may be shown above Buddha's head. Buddha is always shown seated in the lotus position, reaching the fingers of his right hand down to touch the ground, which is called the bhūmisparśa or "earth witness" mudra. Underneath him, the long fronds of kusa grass may be indicated. Larger depictions may show Mara and his army of demons, or his two (or three) beautiful daughters, who attempt to prevent the Buddha's enlightenment by distracting him from meditation with seductive dance movements; modern South-East Asian depictions of this can be rather lurid.

Pṛthivi cannot usually be seen in Indian depictions, or those of most countries, but a composition often seen in Thai depictions makes her the central figure, standing in a sort of pavilion, with the Buddha above her. The account in a biography much used in South-East Asia has Pṛthivi answering Buddha's call by wringing out her hair, which produces a great flood that sweeps Mara's army away, and this may be shown in depictions, especially from Thailand and Cambodia. There are also many popular statues and figures of her wringing her hair.

This event in Buddha's life is most commonly the large central scene in groups, as in the Jagdispur stele, where dozens of small demons surround the Buddha.

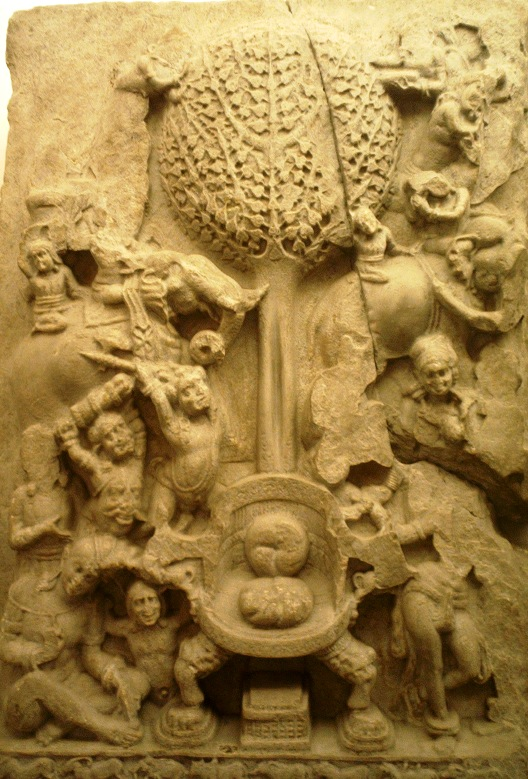
An aniconic representation of Mara's assault on the Buddha, with an empty throne, 2nd century, Amaravati style, India

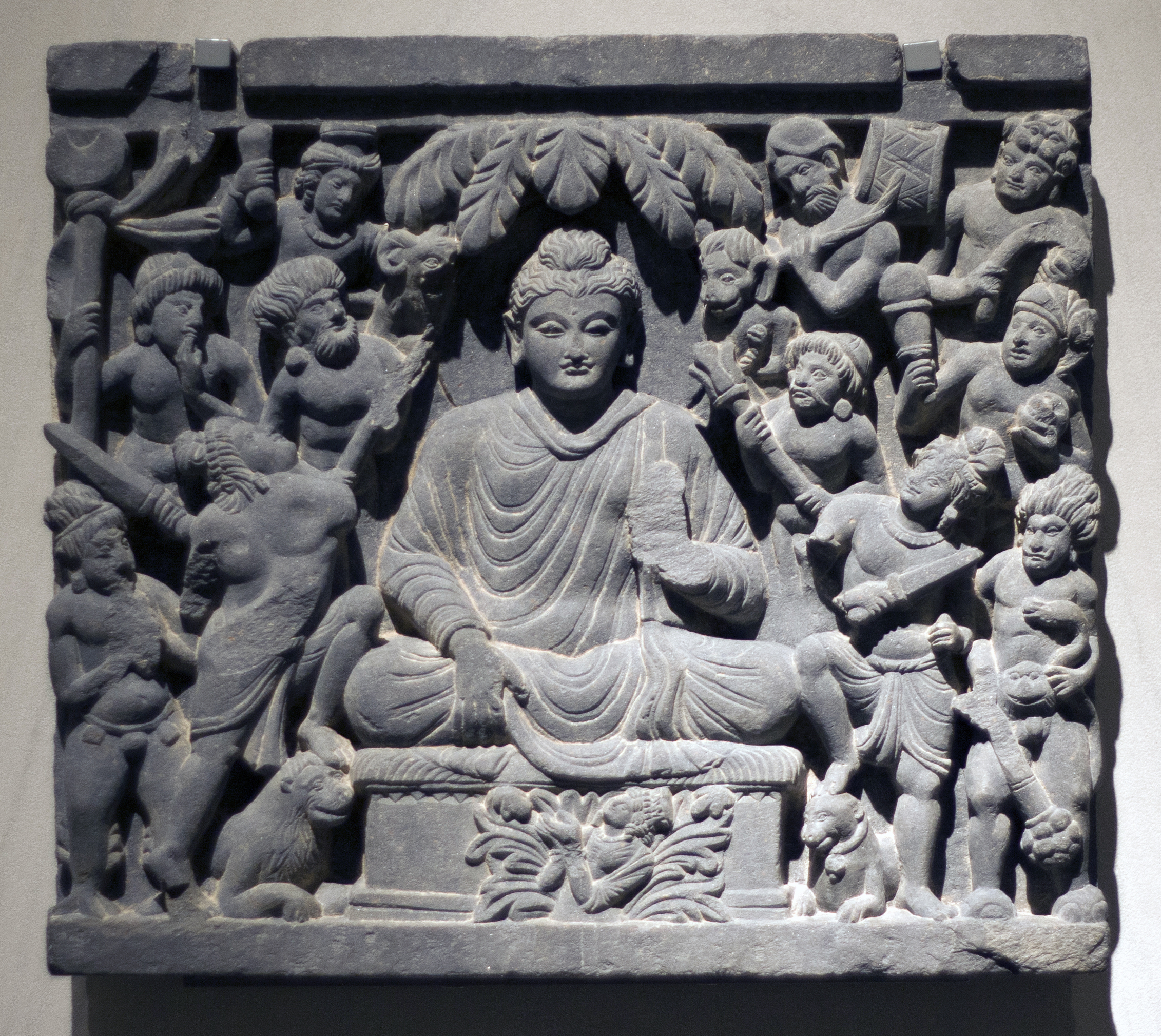
Assault of Mara, Gandhara

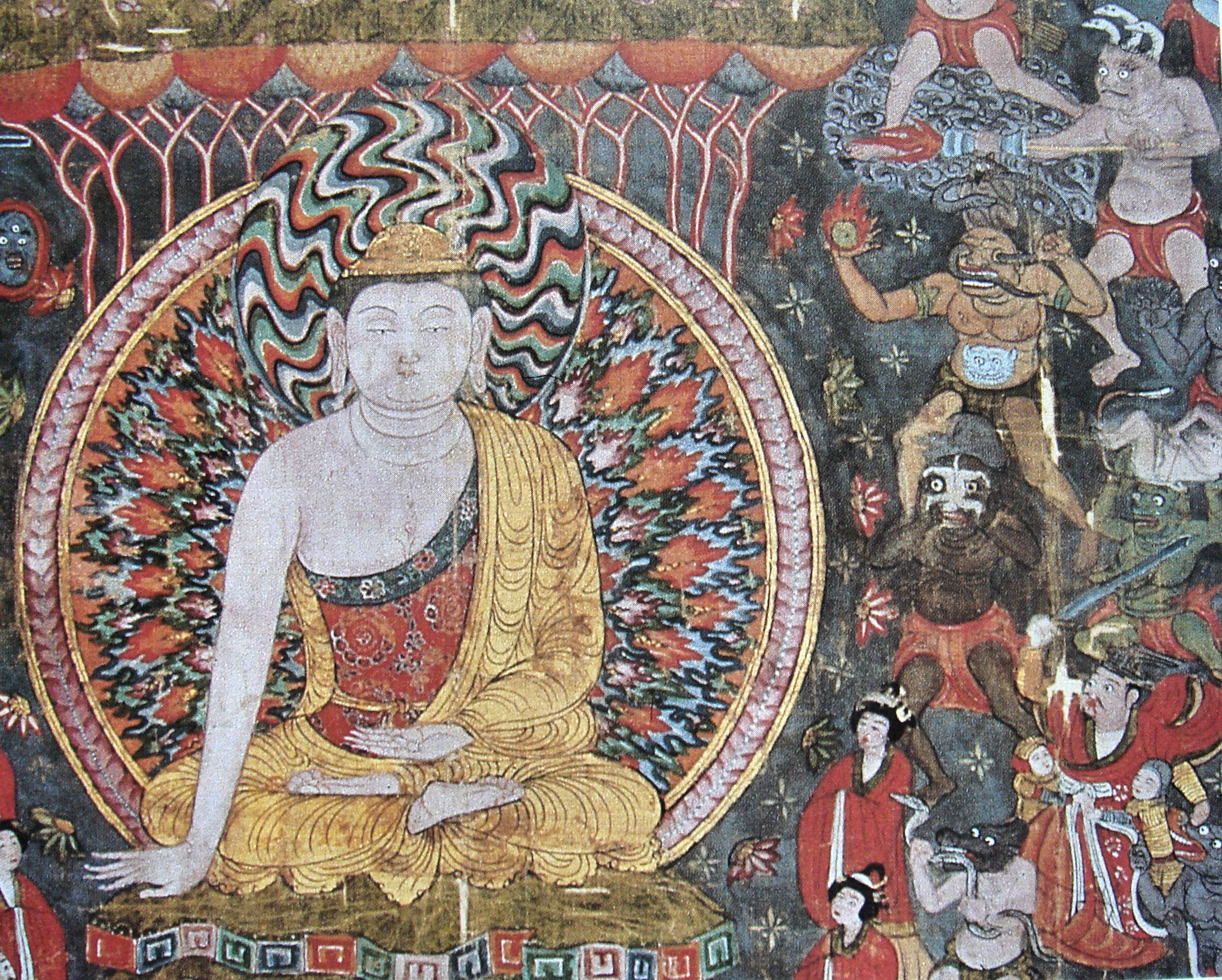
Detail of painting on silk, Mogao Caves, 10th century

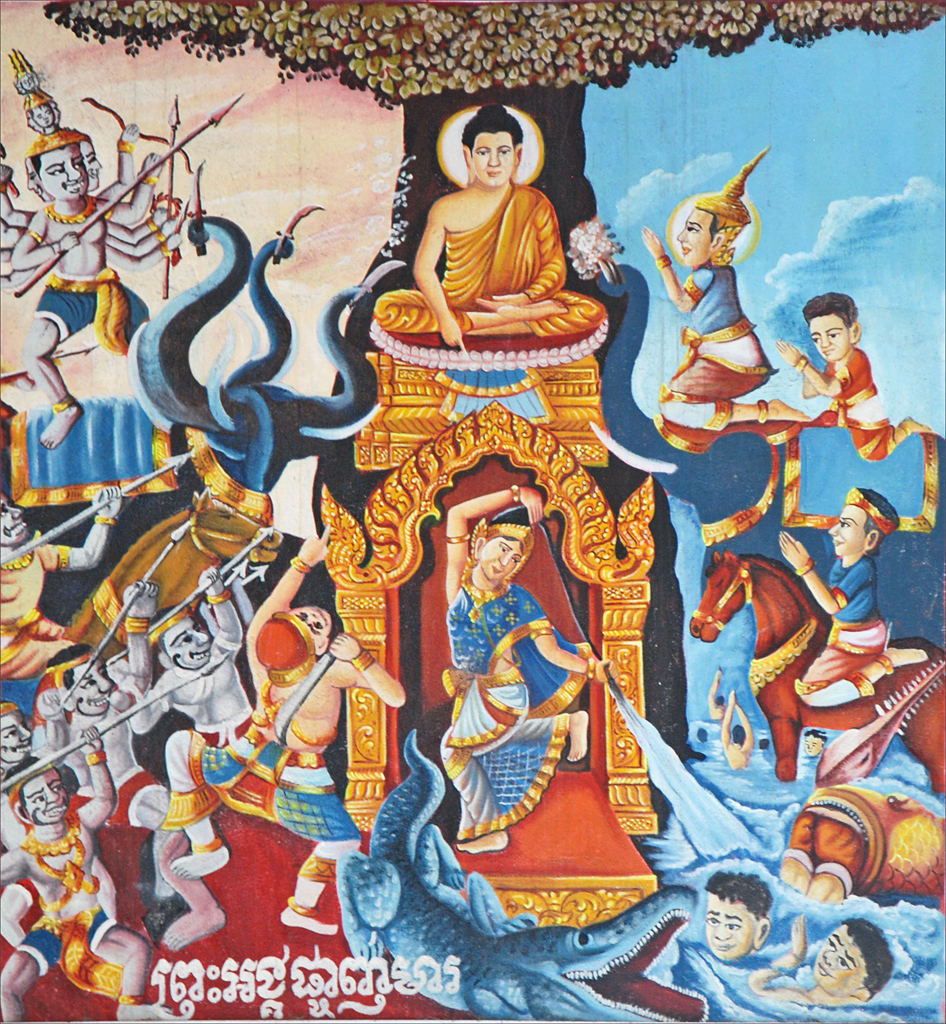
Modern Vietnamese depiction, with Pṛthivi wringing out her hair, to produce a flood that sweeps Mara's army away

=== Meditation period ===
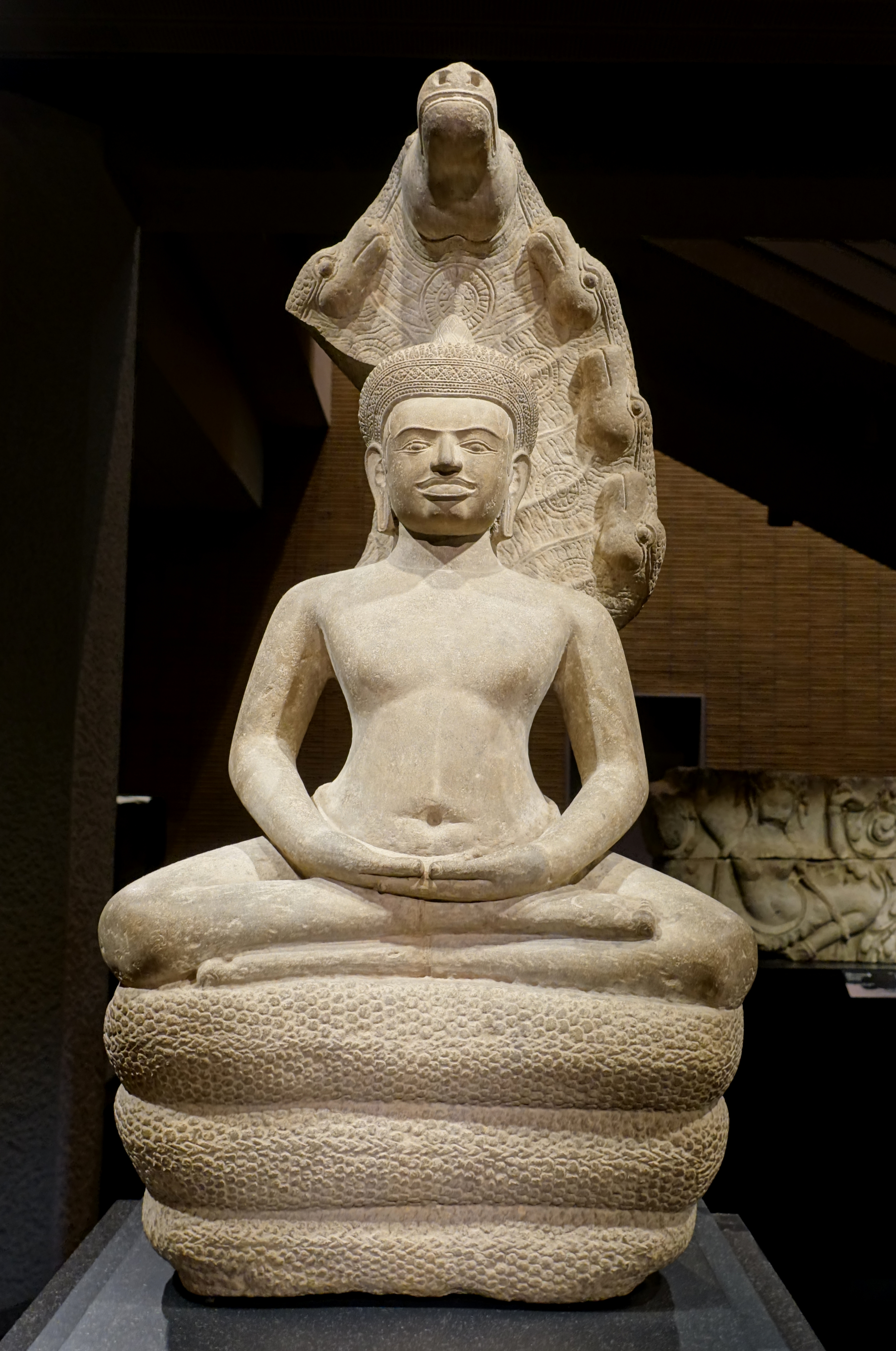
Buddha sheltered by Mucalinda, Angkor Thom, Cambodia, 12th-century

After his Enlightenment, the Buddha remained meditating in the forest for seven weeks, with various incidents recorded in the biographies. In later Buddhist tradition, a set of "Seven Stations" developed, each lasting a week, where the Buddha spent a week meditating in seven different places (the sequence and descriptions vary somewhat). A week each was spent under the Bodhi Tree, looking at the Bodhi Tree, "walking on the jewelled path", "thinking in the jewelled chamber", and "meditating under a banyan tree". Modern prints from South-East Asia can show these as a group.

Towards the end of the period (week five or six) there was very heavy rain and the giant nagaraja or cobra snake-king, Mucalinda sheltered the Buddha with the hoods of his several heads. This depiction has long been especially popular in South-East Asia, where Buddha may sit on the coiled body of the snake. Jayavarman VII, ruler of the Khmer Empire from 1181 to 1218, promoted it as "the major form of the Buddha for worship", for reasons that are now unclear.

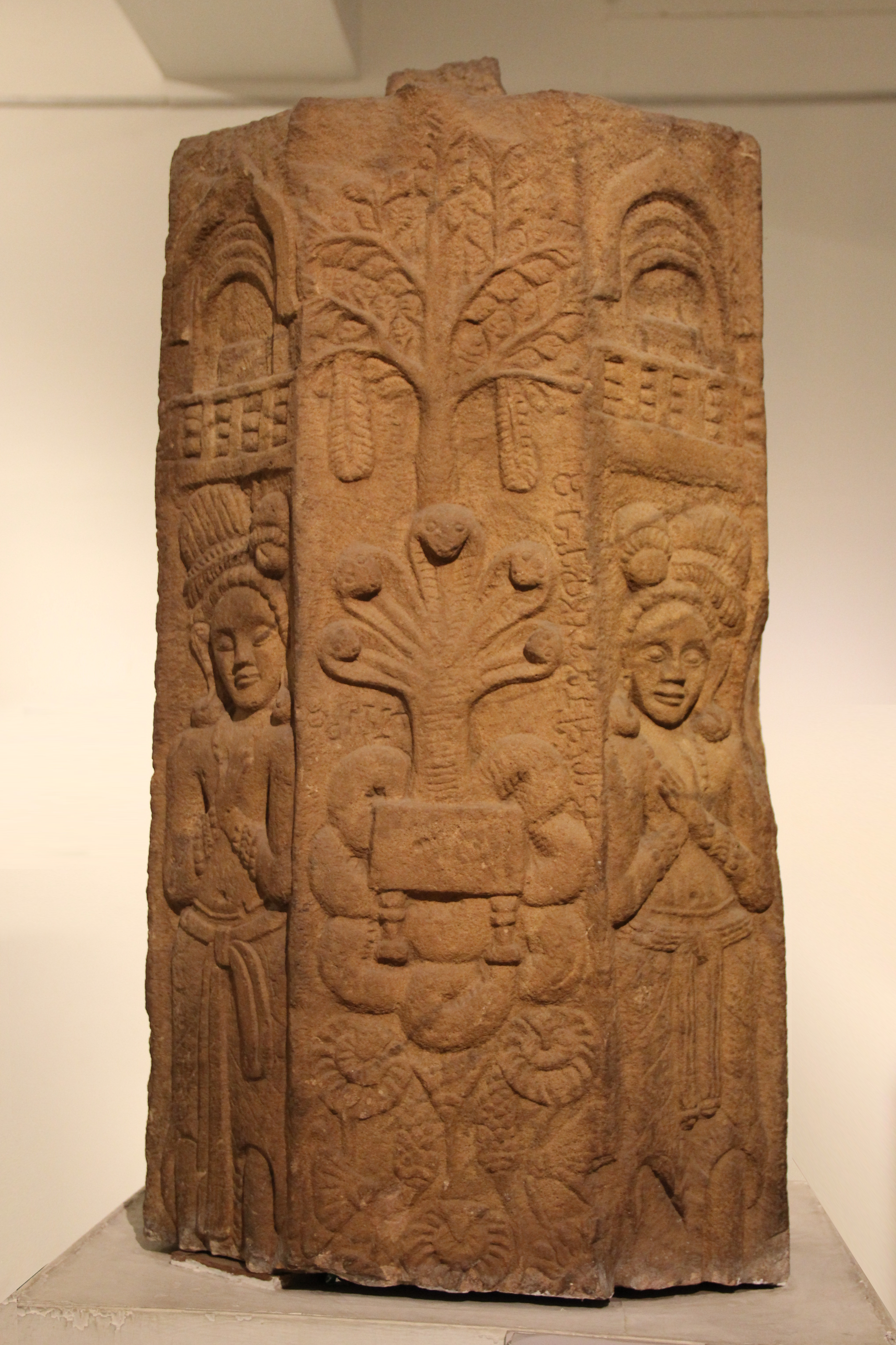
Pillar with Naga Mucalinda protecting the throne of the Buddha. Pauni, 2nd–1st century BCE. National Museum of India.

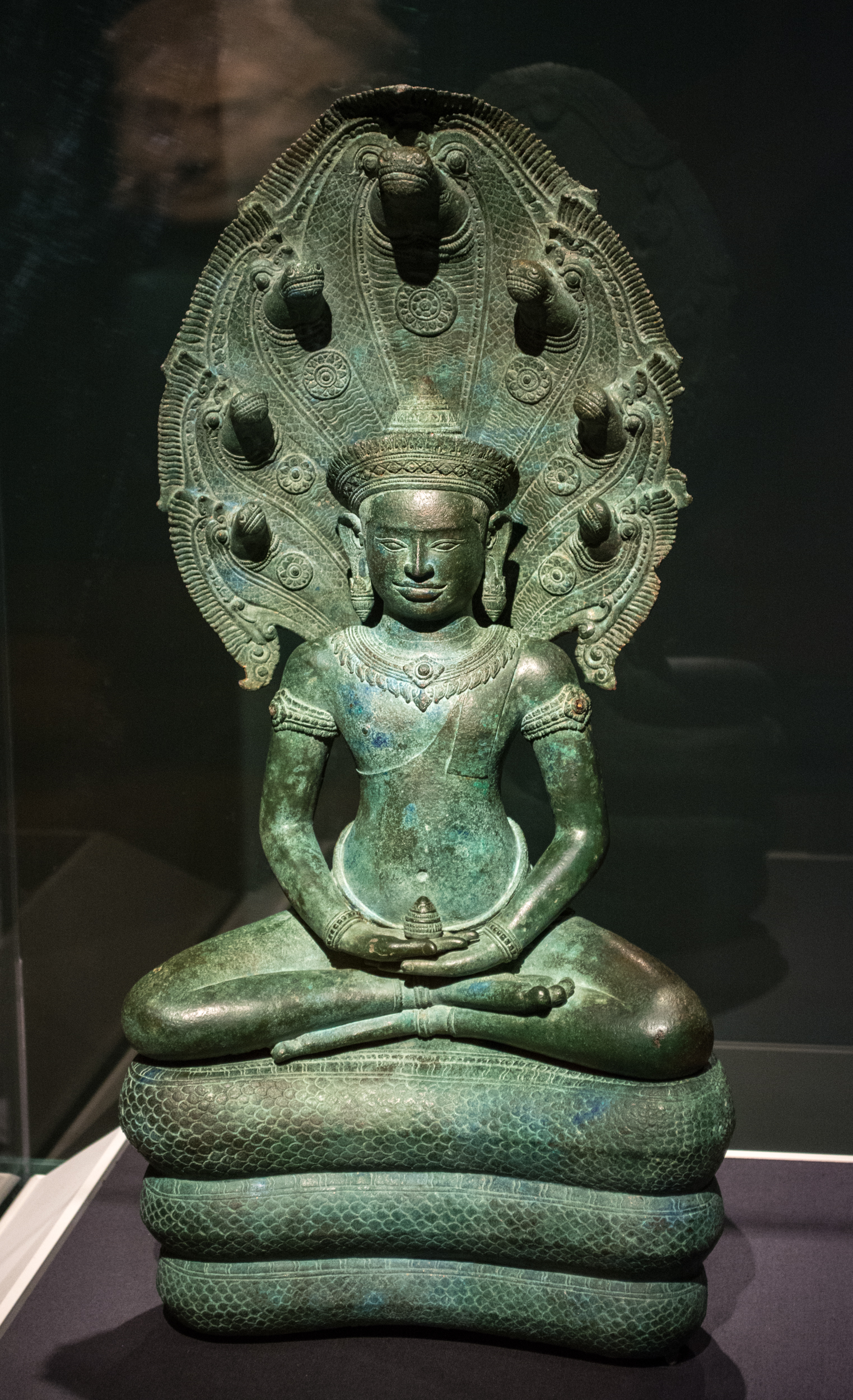
12th century Khmer bronze Naga-enthroned Buddha from Banteay Chhmar, Cambodia. Cleveland Museum of Art.

=== Buddha's first sermon ===
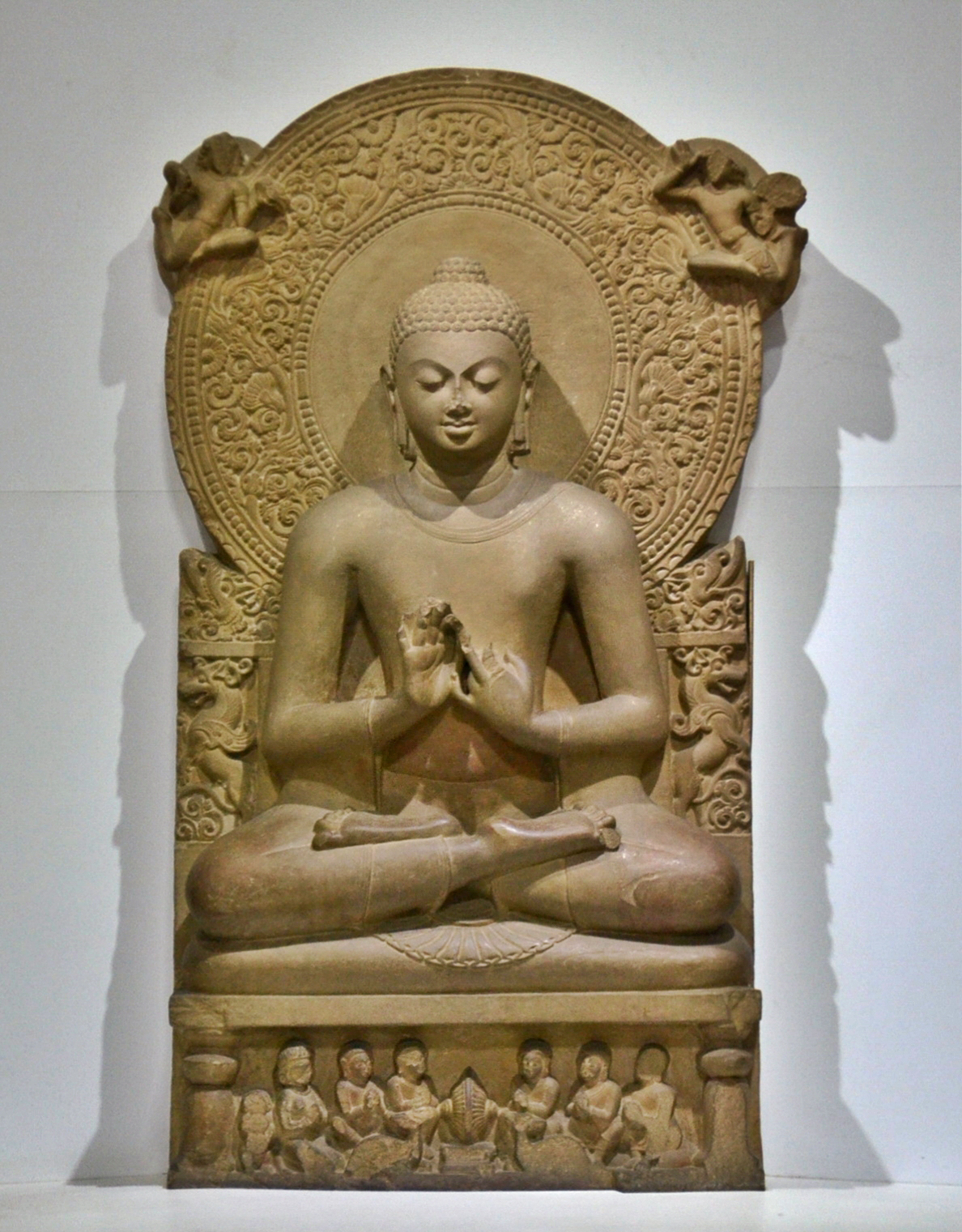
Buddha Preaching his First Sermon, c. 475, with the wheel and disciples on the base

This is the third of the Eight Great Events and included in all such groupings. It is often known as the "Sermon in the Deer Park", and is recorded in the text called the Dhammacakkappavattana Sutta ("The Setting in Motion of the Wheel of the Dharma Sutta"). Among other key Buddhist doctrines it set out the Four Noble Truths and the Middle Way.

It was delivered at Sarnath, some weeks after his Enlightenment, to five named disciples who had known him as an ascetic, who may be shown if they can be fitted in. Sometimes a sixth figure is shown, muscular and usually naked to the waist. This is Vajrapani, a bodhisattva who is often shown protecting the Buddha. Buddha is seated, normally in the lotus position, and his hands are always shown in the Dharmachakra Pravartana Mudrā, where his two hands mime his metaphor of "setting in motion the Wheel of the Dharma". This is generally only used in images of the Buddha when representing this moment.

This or the Enlightenment are usually the main large scene in stele groups. In larger groups a wheel may figure, as in a 5th-century stele at Sarnath, and sometimes one or two deer, referring to the location. These may be on the front of the base of Buddha's throne, where the disciples may also appear, much smaller than the Buddha.

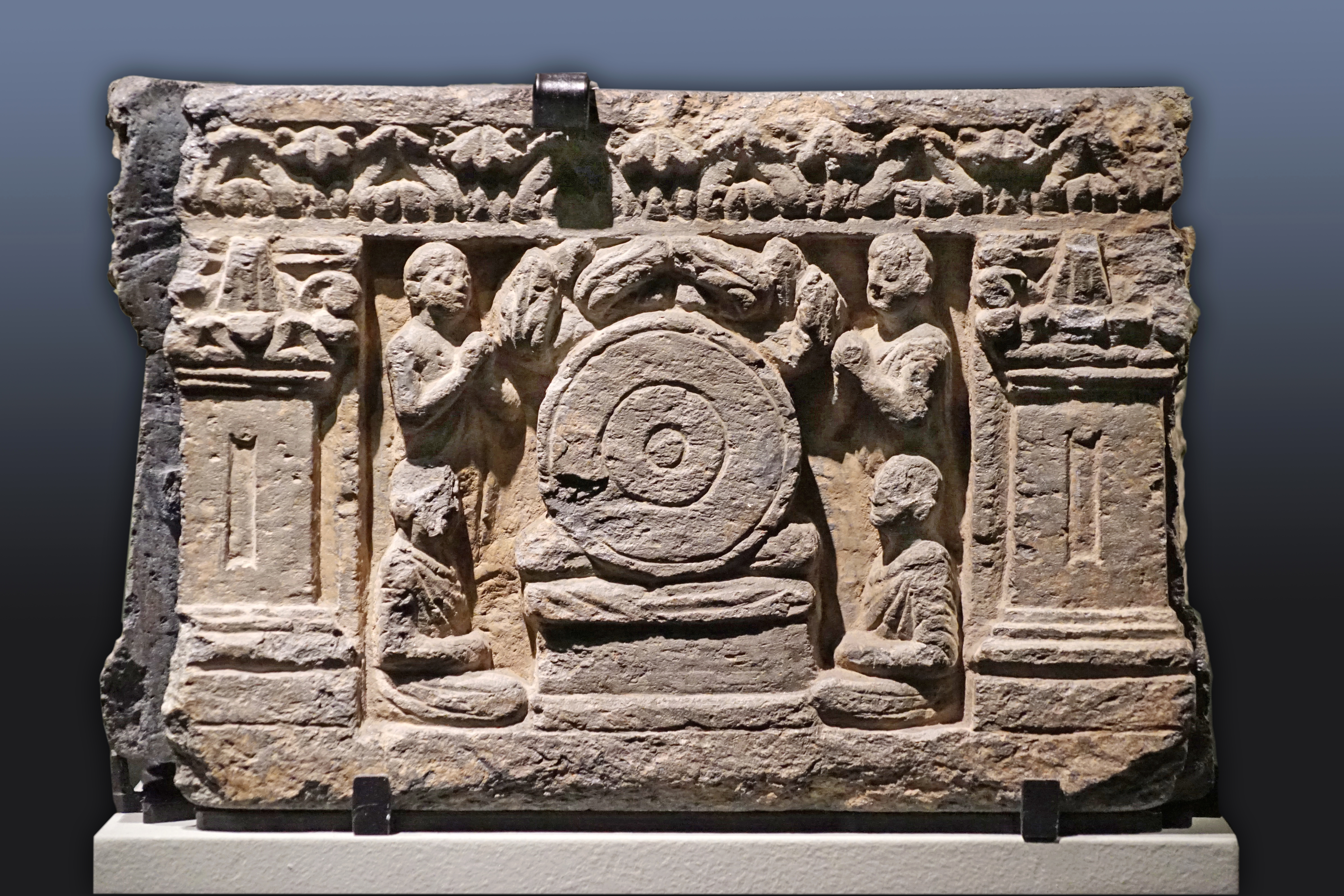
The first sermon. Gandhara.

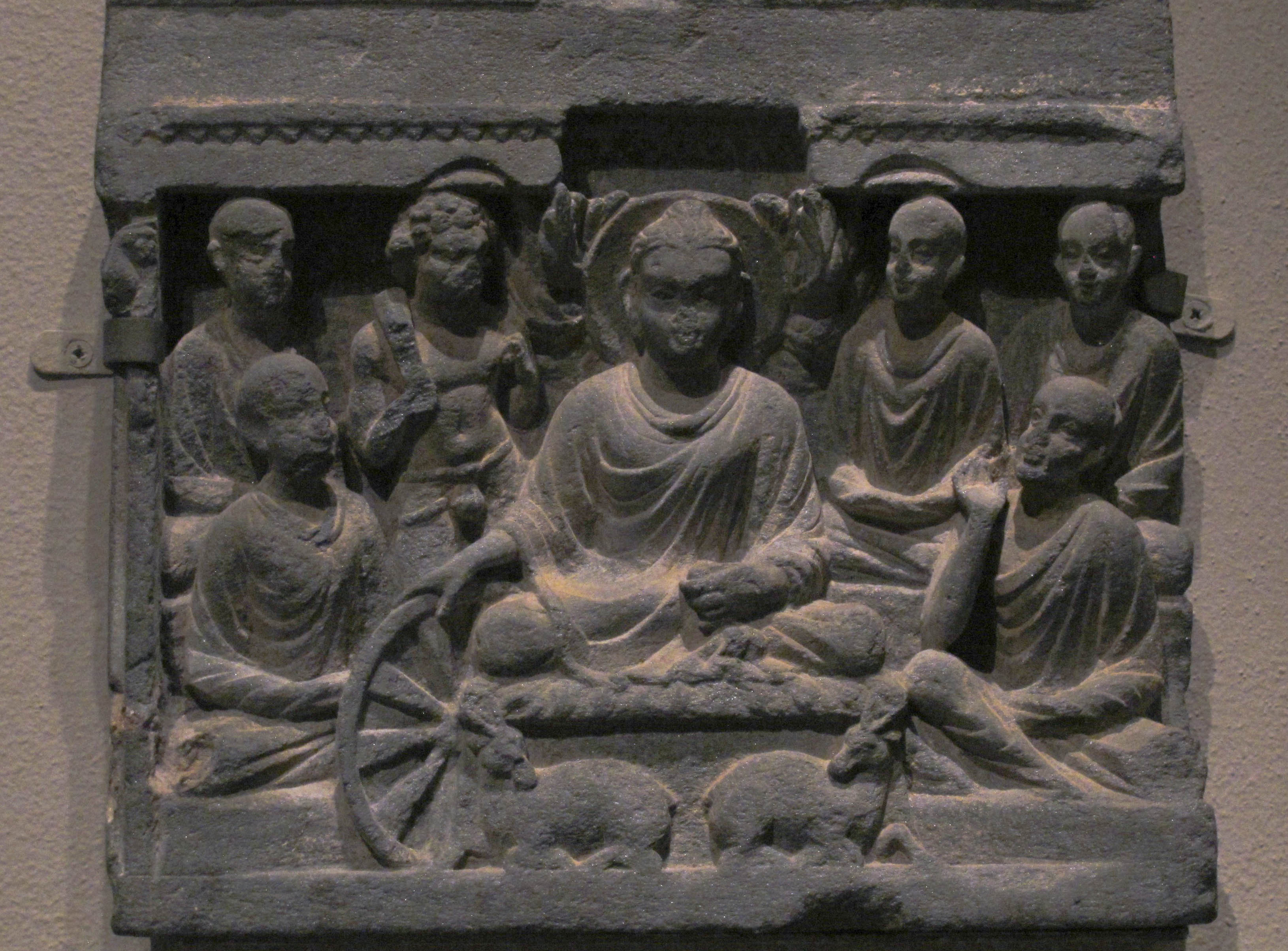
The Buddha's first sermon at Sarnath. Gandhara

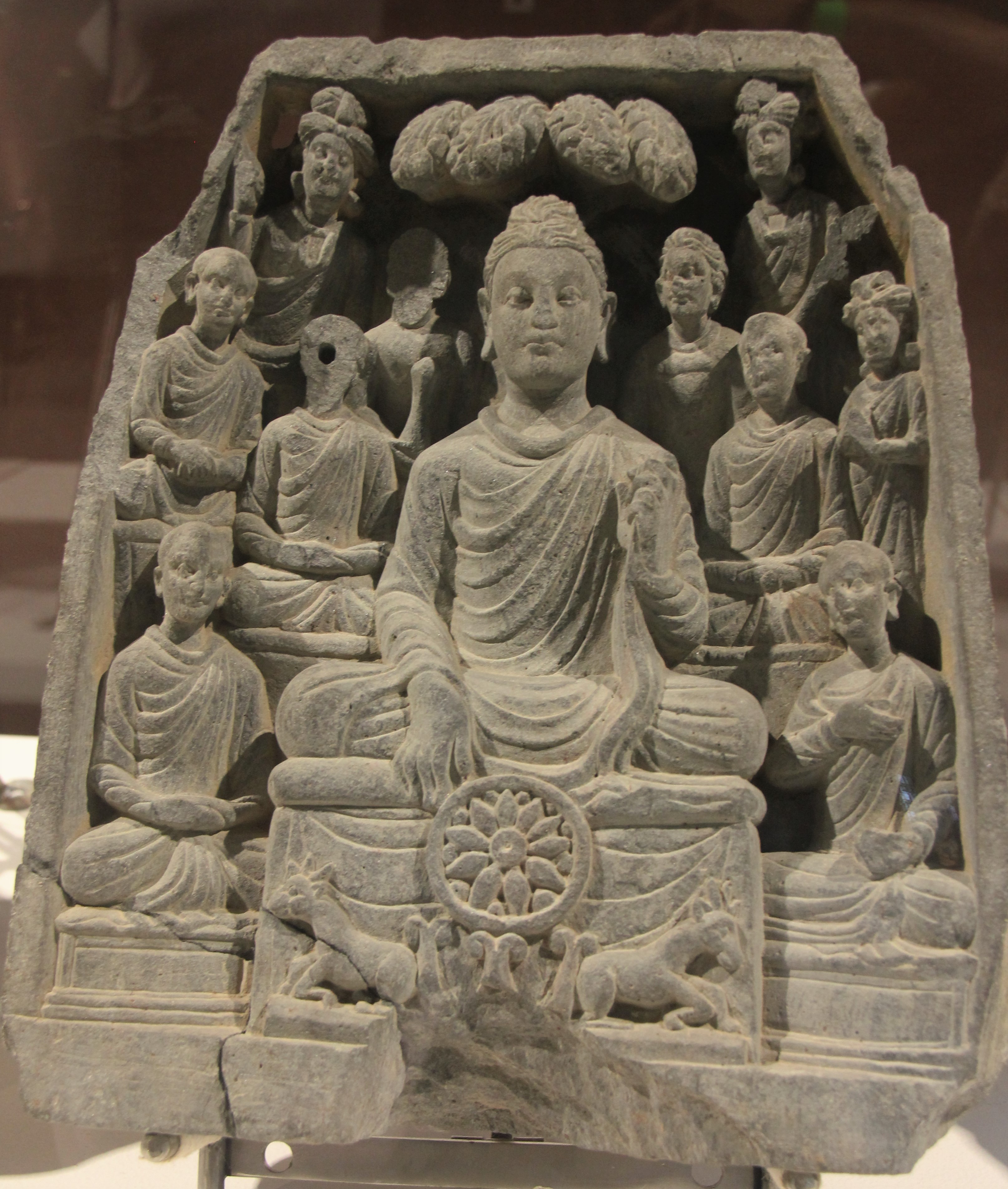
The Buddha's first sermon at Sarnath. Gandhara

=== Conversions, miracles and offerings ===
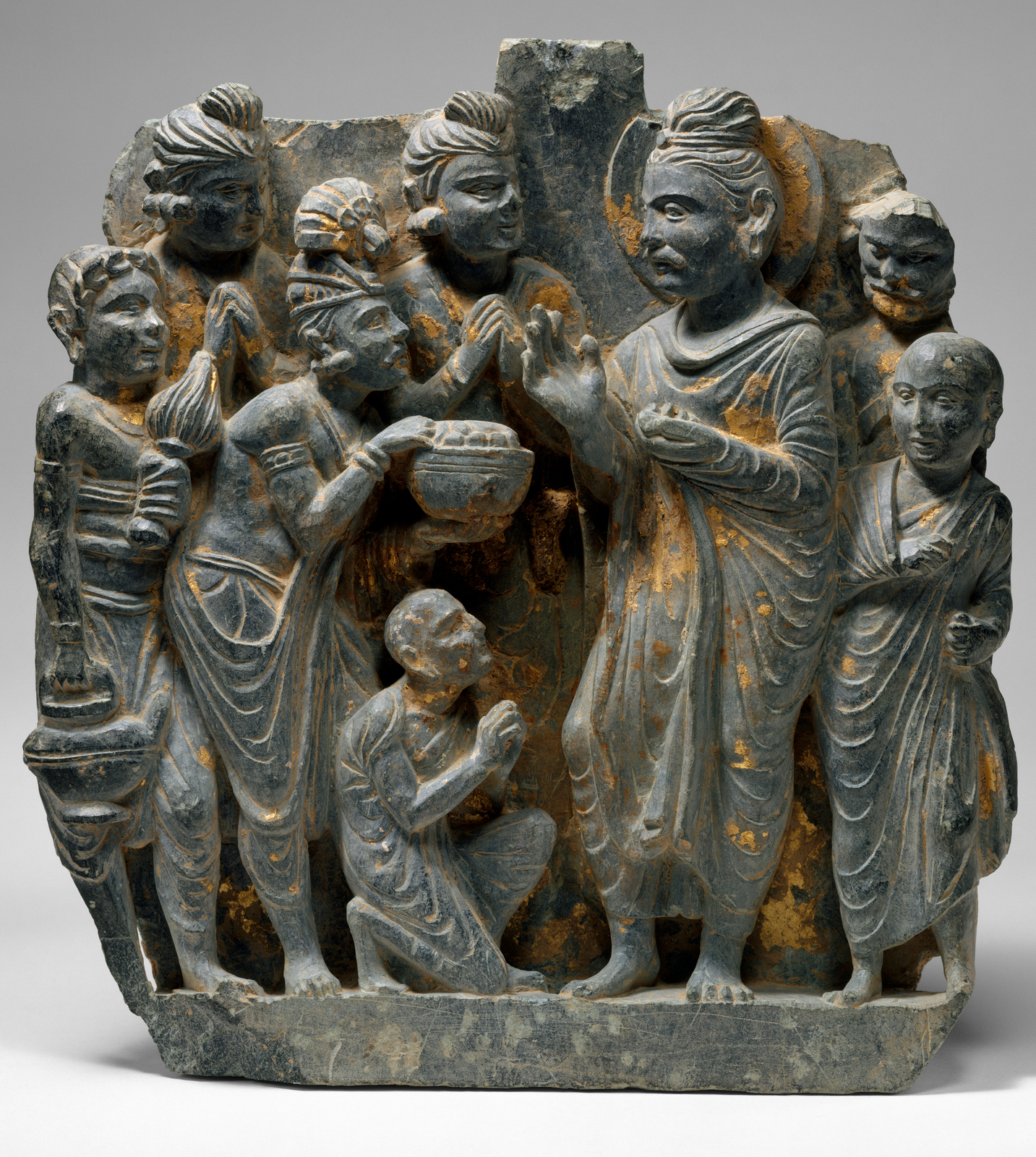
Probably The Gift of Anathapindada, 2nd–3rd century, Gandhara. This panel retains some of the gilding that many Gandharan reliefs probably originally had.

For the remainder of Buddha's life he travelled around a relatively restricted area of the Indo-Gangetic plain, preaching and making converts, organizing his growing sangha or body of followers, and sometimes receiving gifts and offerings from various Indians, high and low. A number of incidents recorded in the biographies may be shown in art; not all can easily be identified in the case of small or damaged reliefs; this is especially the case in cycles which may mix Jataka tales and stories from the lives of other Buddhas. In the heavy rains of the monsoon season he remained in one place; latterly these stays were mostly in the monastic settlements established by this time, which initially were probably mainly occupied during the rains.

The Buddha's ten principal disciples, who seem to be historical figures, in some cases very important figures in the early development of Buddhism, are given personalities in the literature, and various anecdotes concerning them are depicted in art, with or without the Buddha being present.

The large donation by the rich merchant Anathapindika (birth name Sudatta) founded the important early vihara (monastery) of Jetavana; he was supposed to have decided the amount by covering the proposed site with gold coins.

Many stories involve the future rebirths of those whose actions are good. The Offering of Dust shows a story from the Divyāvadāna in which two small boys, Jaya and Vijaya, were playing as the Buddha passed them, begging for alms. Jaya offered a handful of dust, saying it was meal, and expressed a prayer for a chakravartin or universal monarch. Buddha predicted that he would in the course of time be reborn as one, referring to the Emperor Ashoka (c. 304–232 BC), a great promoter of Buddhism.

==== Conversions ====
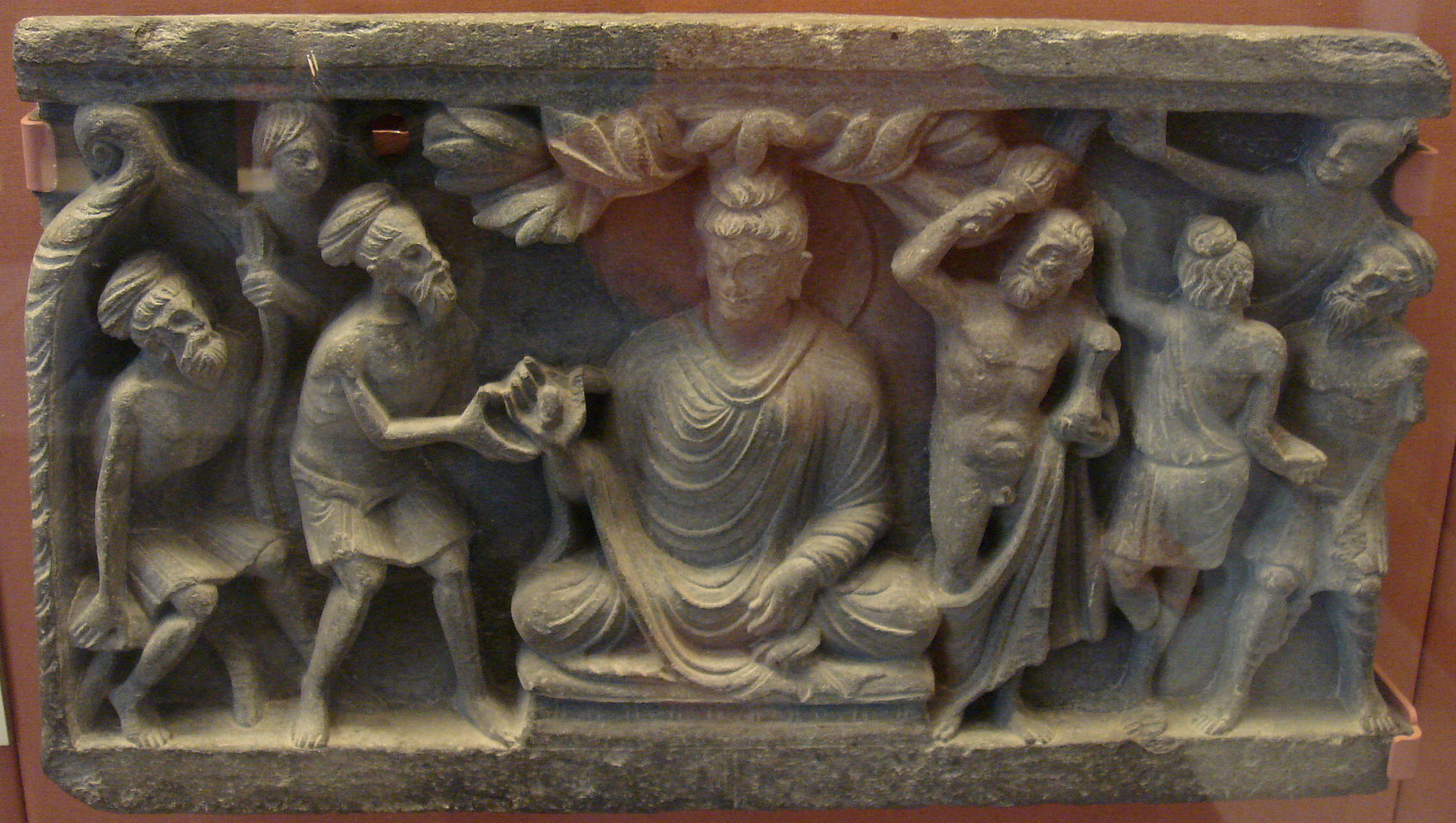
Conversion of the three Kashyapa brothers and their followers, Gandhara. The naked attendant is the Buddha's guardian, Vajrapāṇi.

The first Buddhist converts were those presented at the First Sermon. Other early converts were the three Kasyapa brothers (in some accounts there is just one Kasyapa) and their many followers. They were leading a group of ascetics practicing fire rituals in a form of Vedic religion, with a temple at Uruvilva on the Phalgu River, near where Buddha had been for his most austere period. Buddha asked if he could spend the night in the temple, which was allowed, but he was warned of a terrible Nagaraja (snake deva). The Buddha eventually subdued the Nagaraja, finally kept it inside his alms-bowl, presenting it to Kasyapa. They were impressed and converted with their followers. In Indonesia, there are early standing Buddha statues with Buddha holding his bowl with the snake in it, and the presentation of the remains is found in Gandharan reliefs.

Buddha performed other miracles to convince the Kasyapas, including parting the waters of a river and mind-reading. The former is depicted on the East gate of Stupa 1 at Sanchi.

==== Return to the family ====
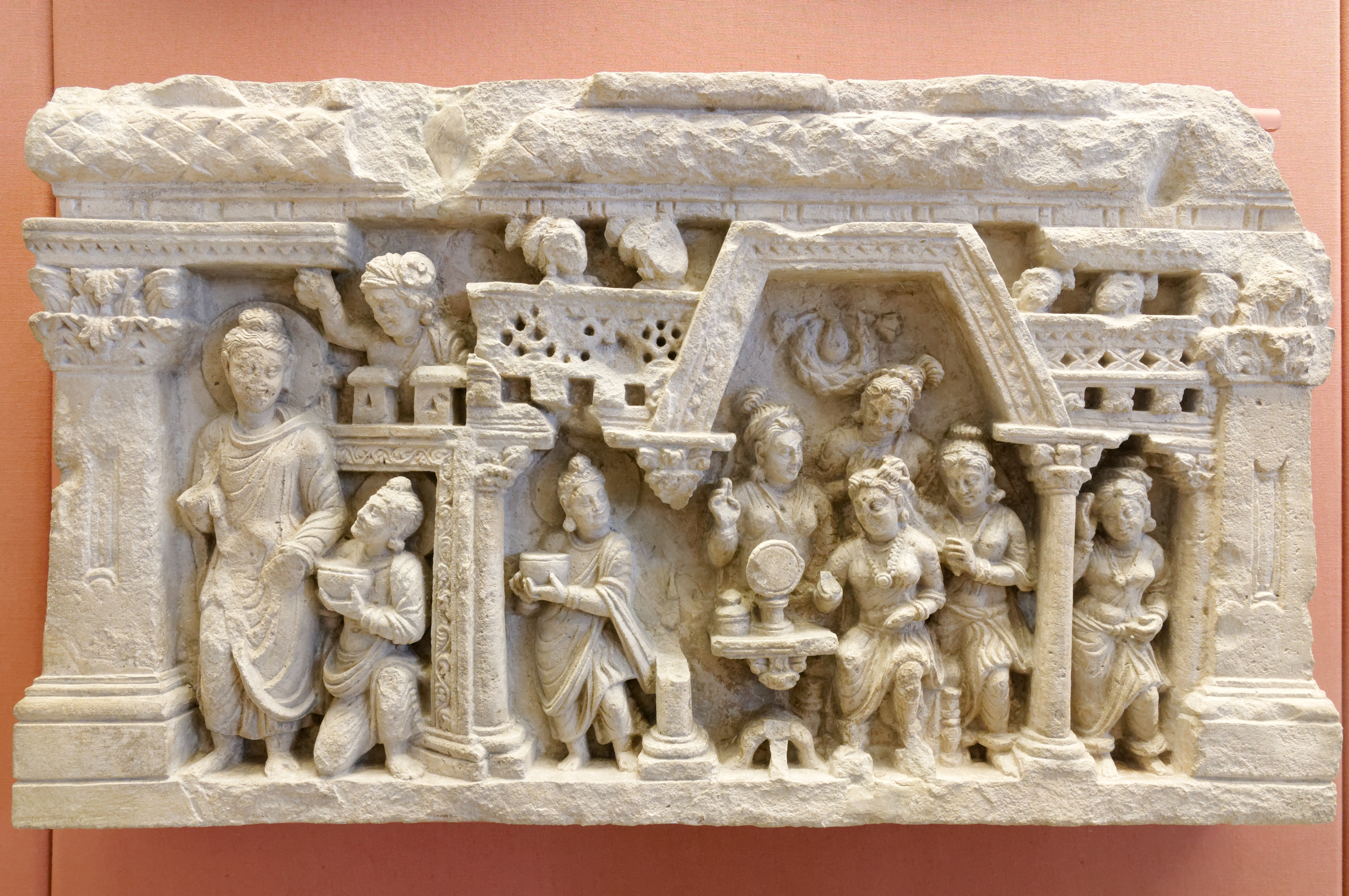
Conversion of Nanda, Hadda, Afghanistan, Gandhara. Sundari Nanda sits at her dressing-table at right, as Nanda leaves with the bowl. At left he kneels before Buddha.

Many of Buddha's relations eventually converted, after Buddha made a visit to his old home at Kapilavastu, perhaps at the request of his father. The moment of return is sometimes shown in art. His son Rāhula, given various ages up to sixteen at this point, agreed to join his father as a novice over the visit. Buddha's, aunt, foster-mother (and stepmother) Mahapajapati Gotami later became the first ordained Buddhist nun (bhikkhunī) after the death of her husband. Her children Nanda and Sundari Nanda, half-brother and sister of Buddha, were married to each other, or were just about to be, but were persuaded to join the sangha. Both had difficulties adjusting, because of their love for each other.

There are varying versions of the story, which are sometimes shown in art. Usually, Nanda dined with the Buddha, who passed him or left his bowl before leaving. Nanda followed him with the bowl, and the Buddha walked with him until they reached the sangha. But Nanda was some time restless as a monk, until the Buddha took him up to the Tavatimsa heaven, which motivated him to continue in his new life. The initial conversion, and the two flying up to heaven, or in heaven, are sometimes shown in art, as is Nanda's "ordination" as a monk.

Ananda, a childhood friend and a cousin, was converted and became a close companion for the rest of his life. Ananda's brother Devadatta also converted.

=== Visit of Indra to the Indrasala Cave ===
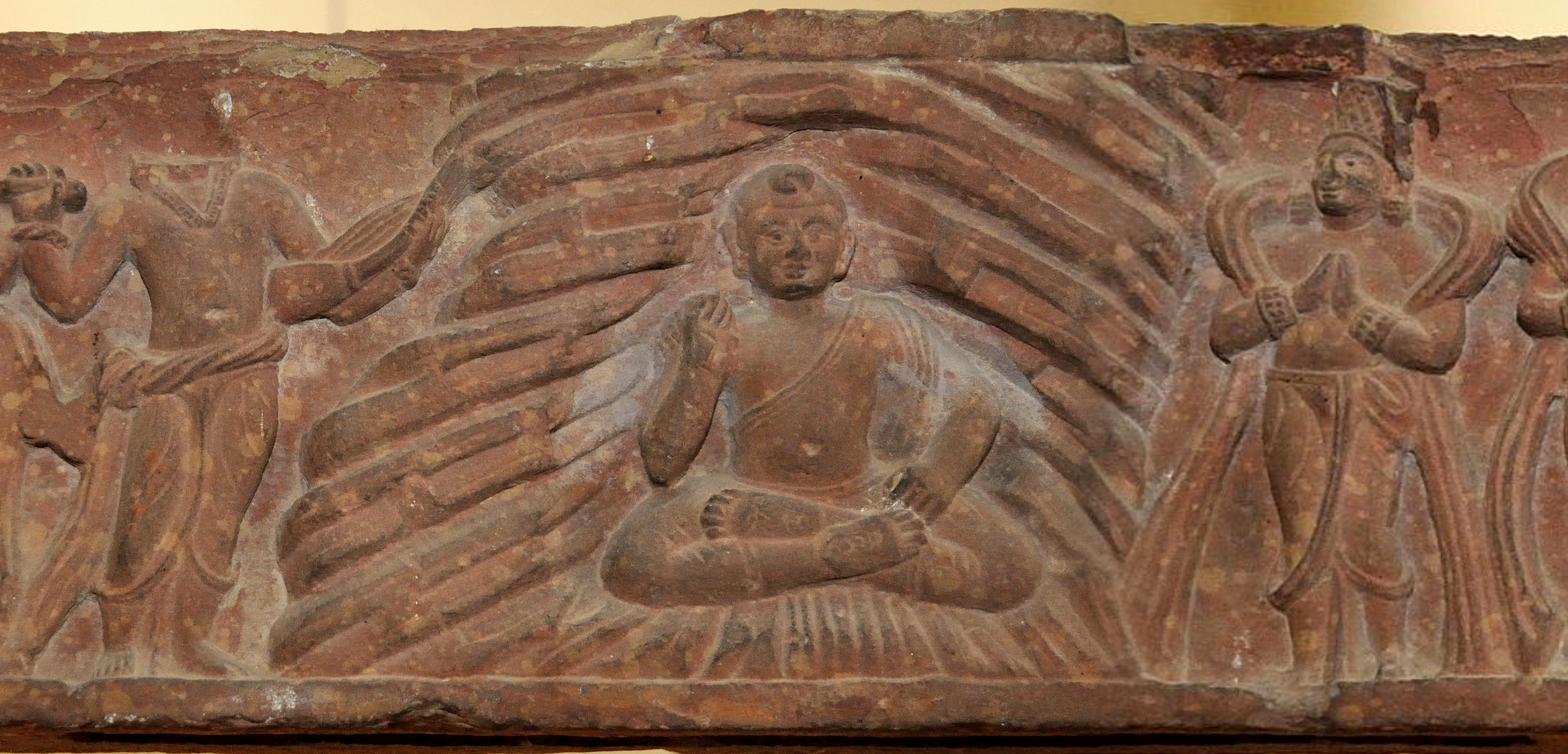
Buddha with Indra at the Indrasala Cave, detail from a crossbar, Mathura 50–100 AD. Harpist at left.

One rainy season retreat of the Buddha was spent in the Indrasala Cave near Rajgir, for which various locations have been proposed. While there, Indra (Sakra in Buddhism) paid the Buddha a visit, and posed him 42 questions, which he was able to answer. Indra sent a deva harpist-singer ahead to sing to the Buddha, who may be shown in depictions.

These begin at Bharut and Mathura in the first century, and the illustrated panel from Mathura (50–100 AD) is one of the earliest known depictions of Buddha as a human form.

=== The monkey's offering ===
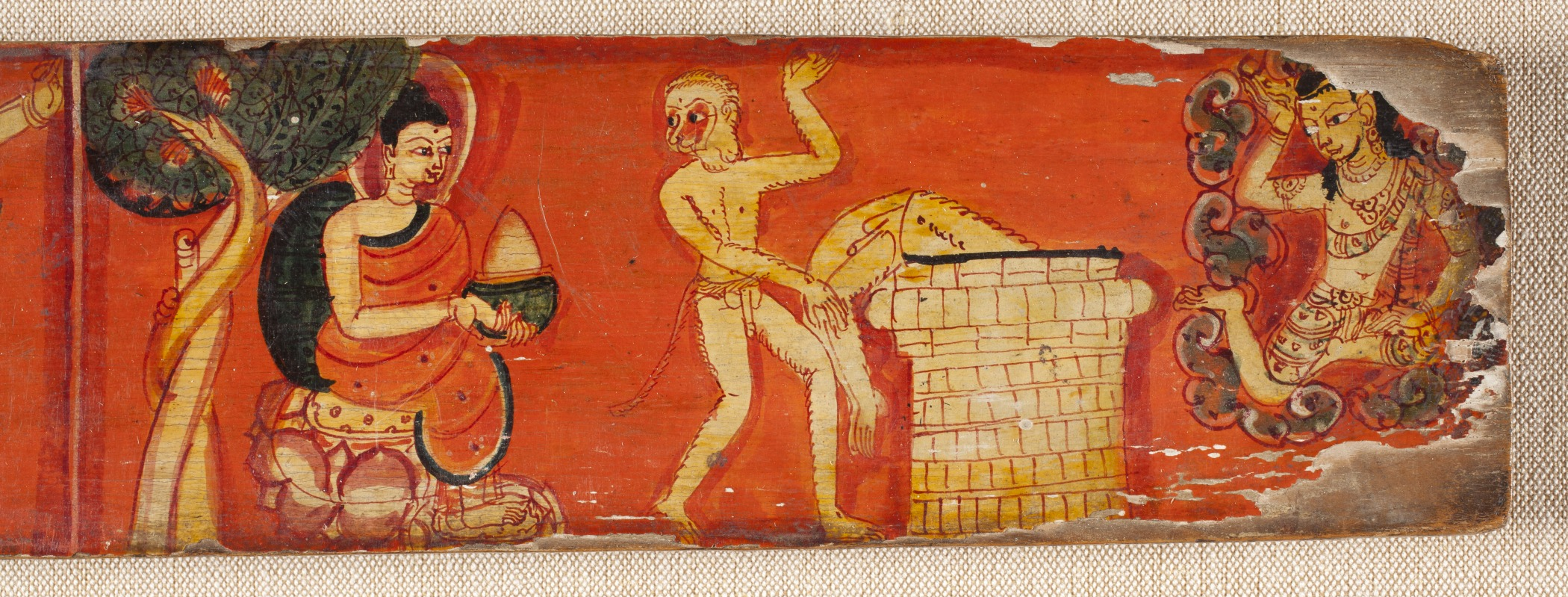
From a 12th-century book-cover, Nepal. The monkey appears three times, at far right as a deva.

One of the Eight Great Events, this took place during the Parileyyakka Retreat at Vaishali, in the tenth year after his Enlightenment. It is also called the Monkey's Offering of Honey. A monkey offers honey to Buddha, who is shown in the lotus position, with his begging bowl in his lap. In some versions the Buddha initially rejected the honey because it had bee larvae, ants or other insects in it, but after the monkey carefully removed these with a twig his gift was accepted.

It is the most obscure of the eight events, not in the standard early biographical texts, and relatively uncommonly depicted before it became one of the Eight Great Events around the 8th century. It is also rather unclear from the texts why it is connected to Vaishali, but this was an important city with other connections with the Buddha, who preached his last sermon there. He left his begging bowl in the city when he departed, and this, which became an important cetiya or relic, is the indispensable identifying element in the most reduced images, when even the monkey is not shown. The monkey may be shown, and also an elephant who also protected Buddha and gave him water. Each of these had divergent and initially unhappy after-stories. The monkey, overcome with excitement when his gift is accepted, fell or jumped down a well in some versions, but was later saved and turned into a deva, or was reborn as a human who joined Buddha's sangha as a monk.

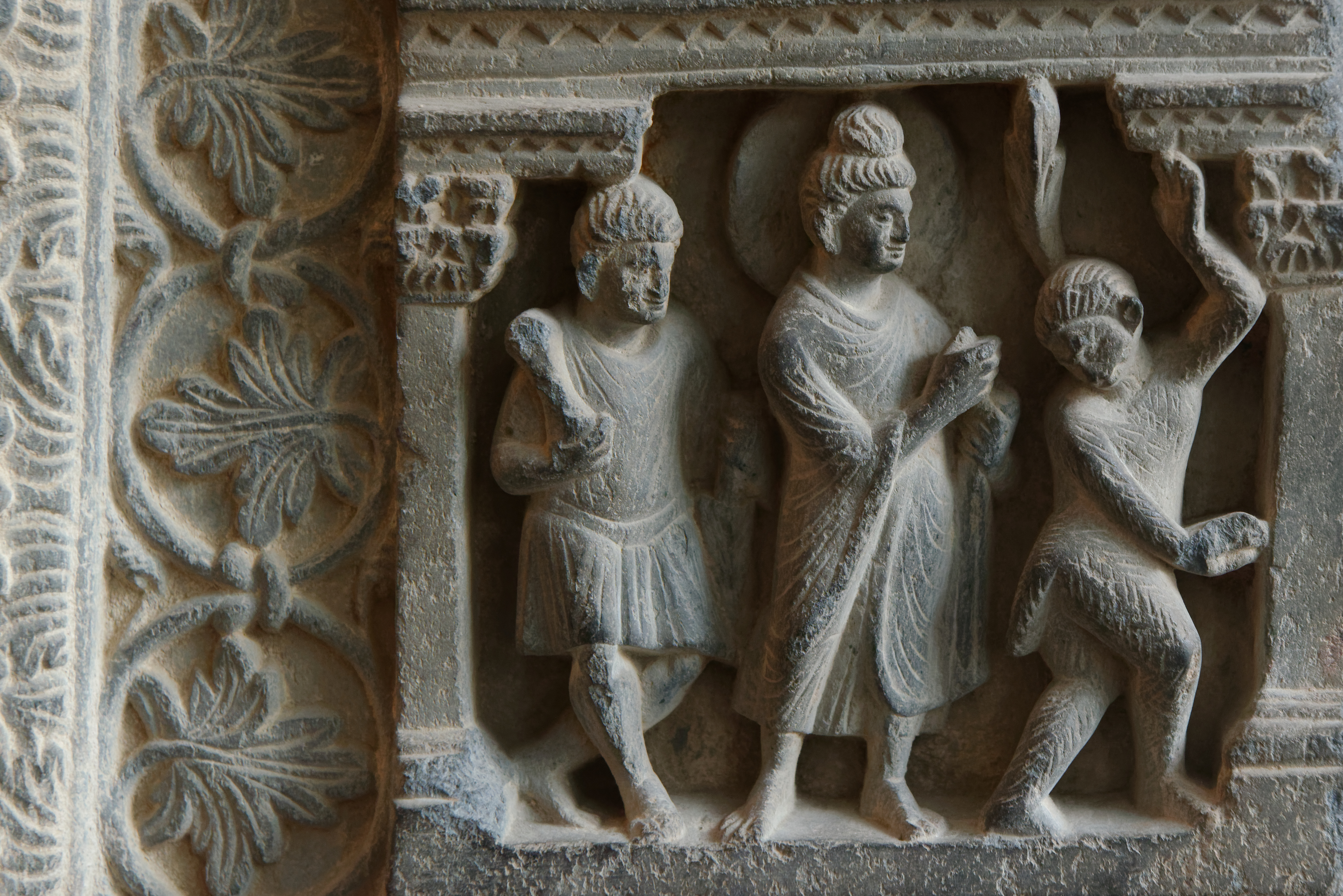
One of the few Gandharan depictions of the monkey offering honey. His gift accepted, the monkey dances excitedly.

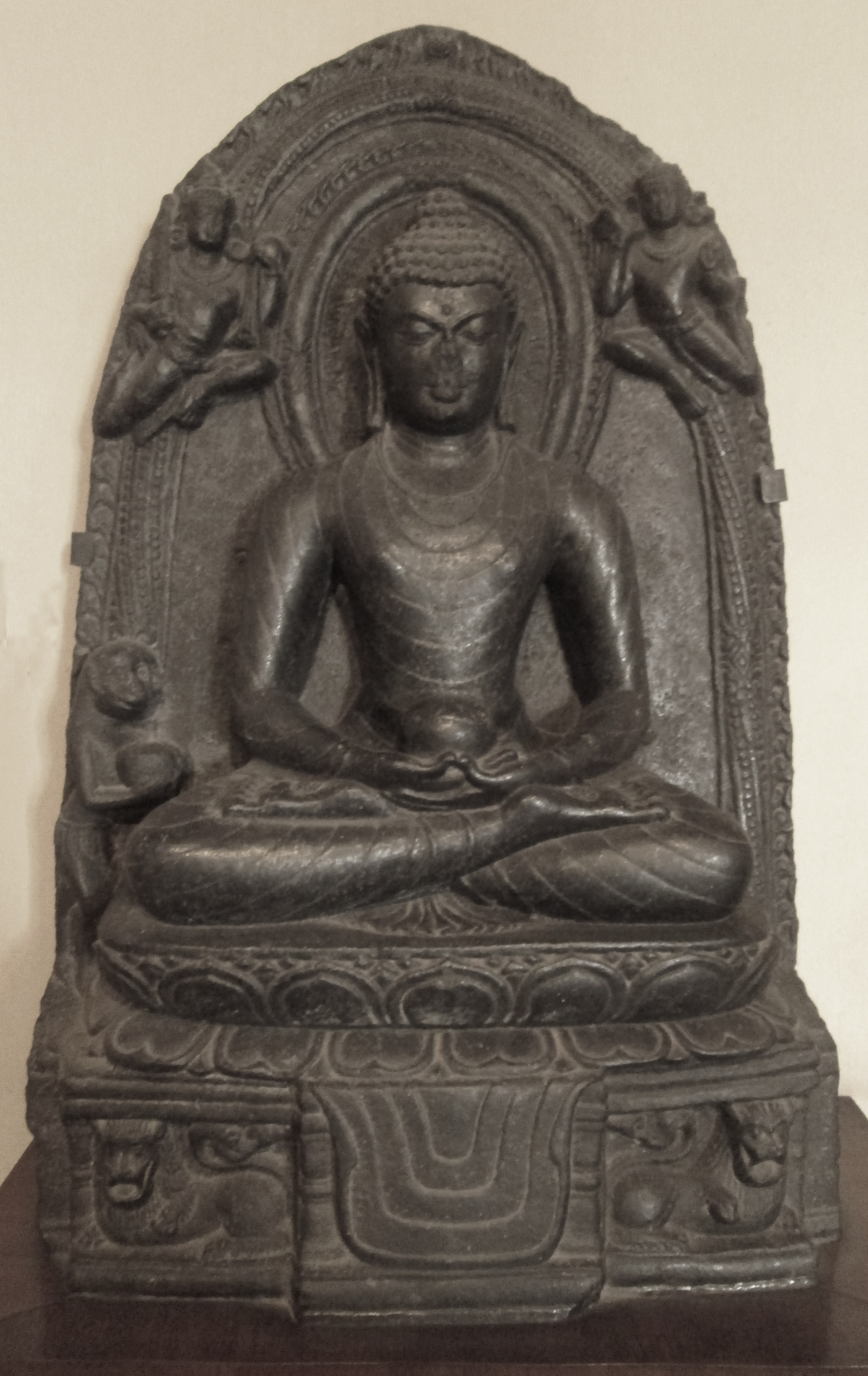
Buddha with small monkey at left; both have bowls.

=== Taming Nalagiri the elephant ===
One of the Eight Great Events. The Buddha's cousin and brother-in-law Devadatta is portrayed in Buddhist tradition as an evil and schismatic figure. He is said to have attempted to kill Buddha by setting the ferocious elephant Nalagiri on Buddha, at Rajgir. Buddha pacifies the elephant, who kneels before him. Buddha is usually shown standing, with his hand in the abhayamudra, with his right hand held open and the palm vertical. The elephant is usually much smaller, often at the scale of a small dog compared to Buddha, and shown bowing to Buddha. Sometimes a small figure of Ananda, a close disciple, stands by Buddha, as in some texts of the story he remained with Buddha during the episode.

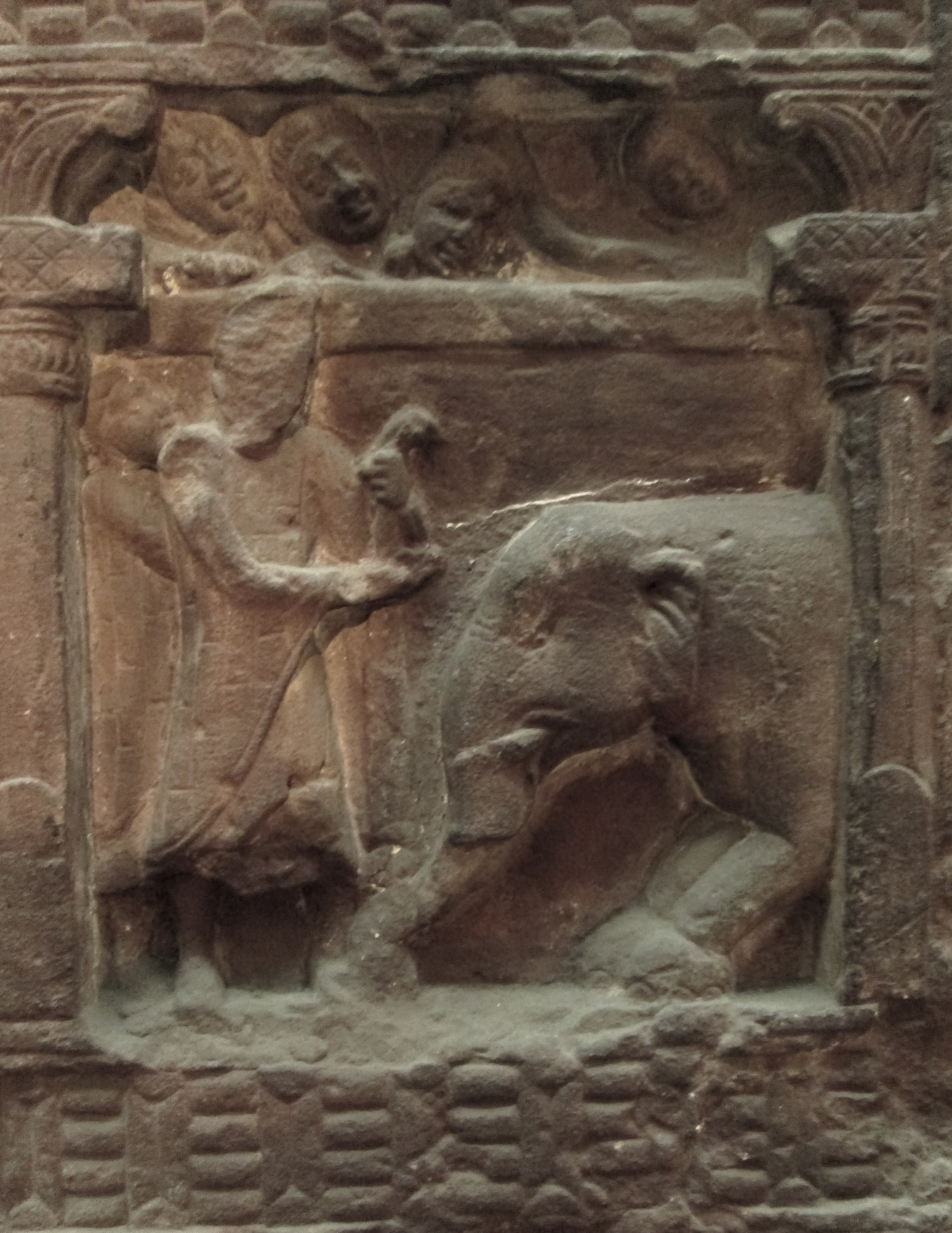
Nalagiri subdued, rear of a pillar with the Bhuteswar Yakshis, 2nd century

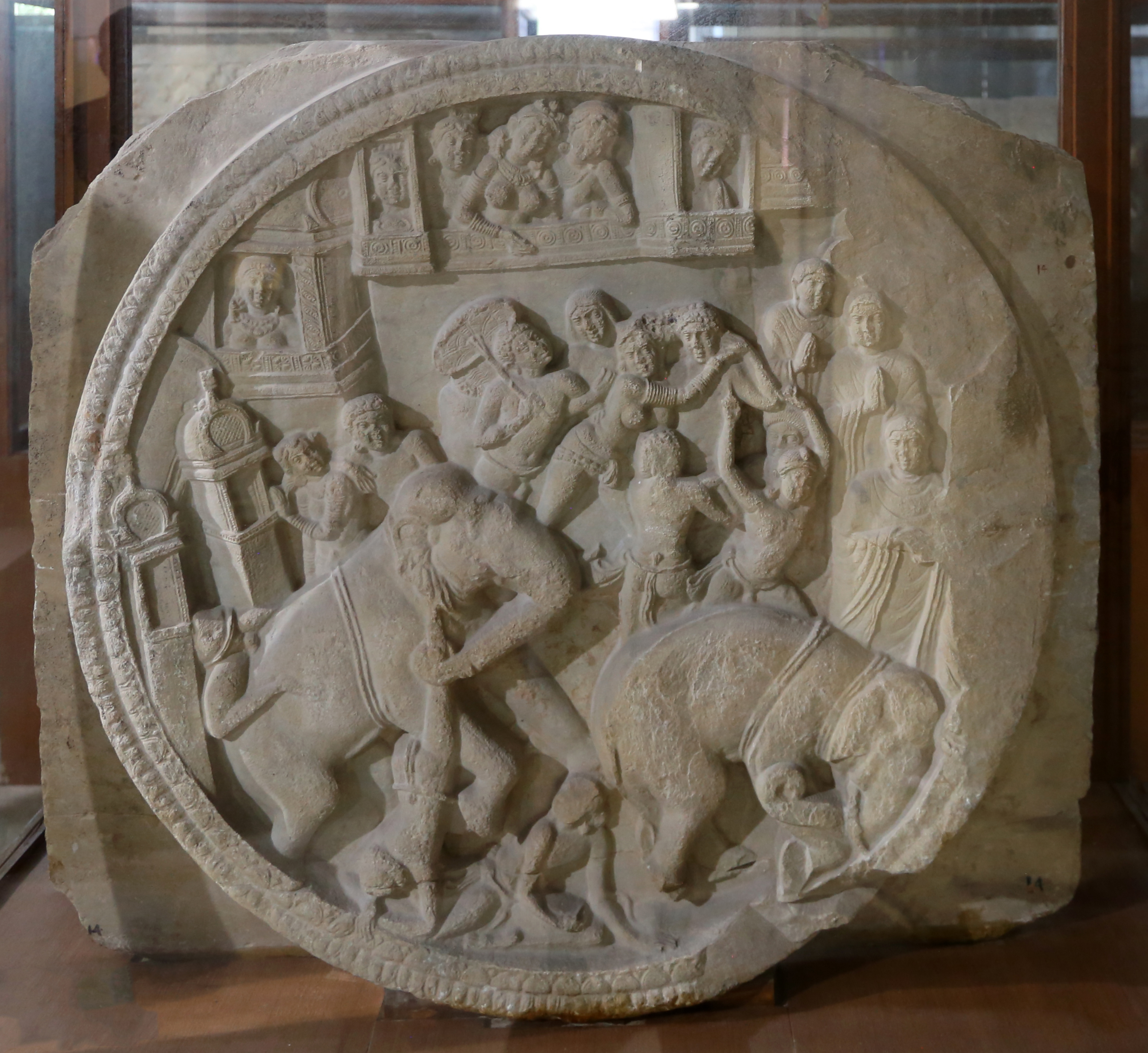
Amaravarti, c. 150

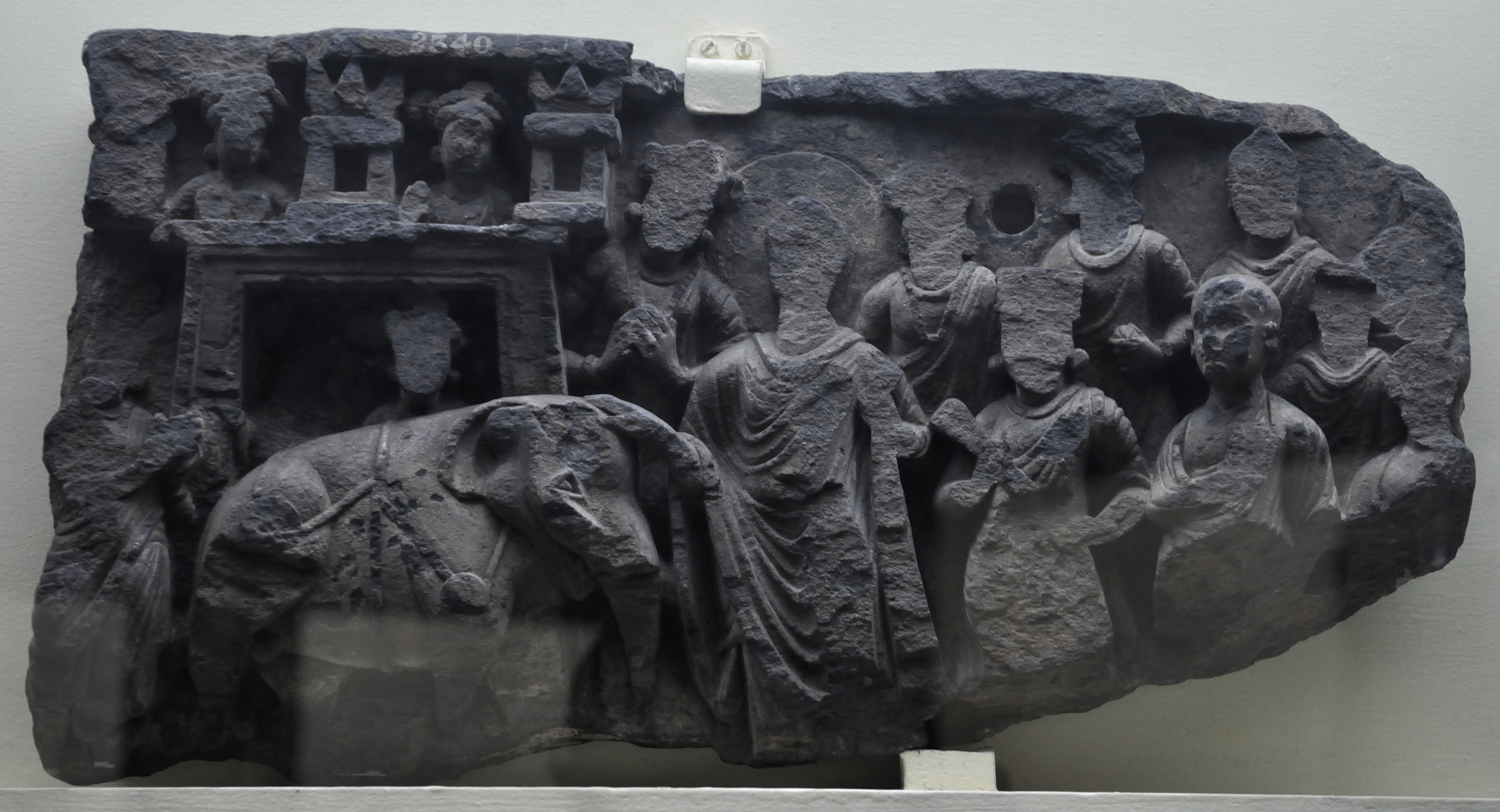
Subjugation of Nalagiri by the Buddha, Gandhara

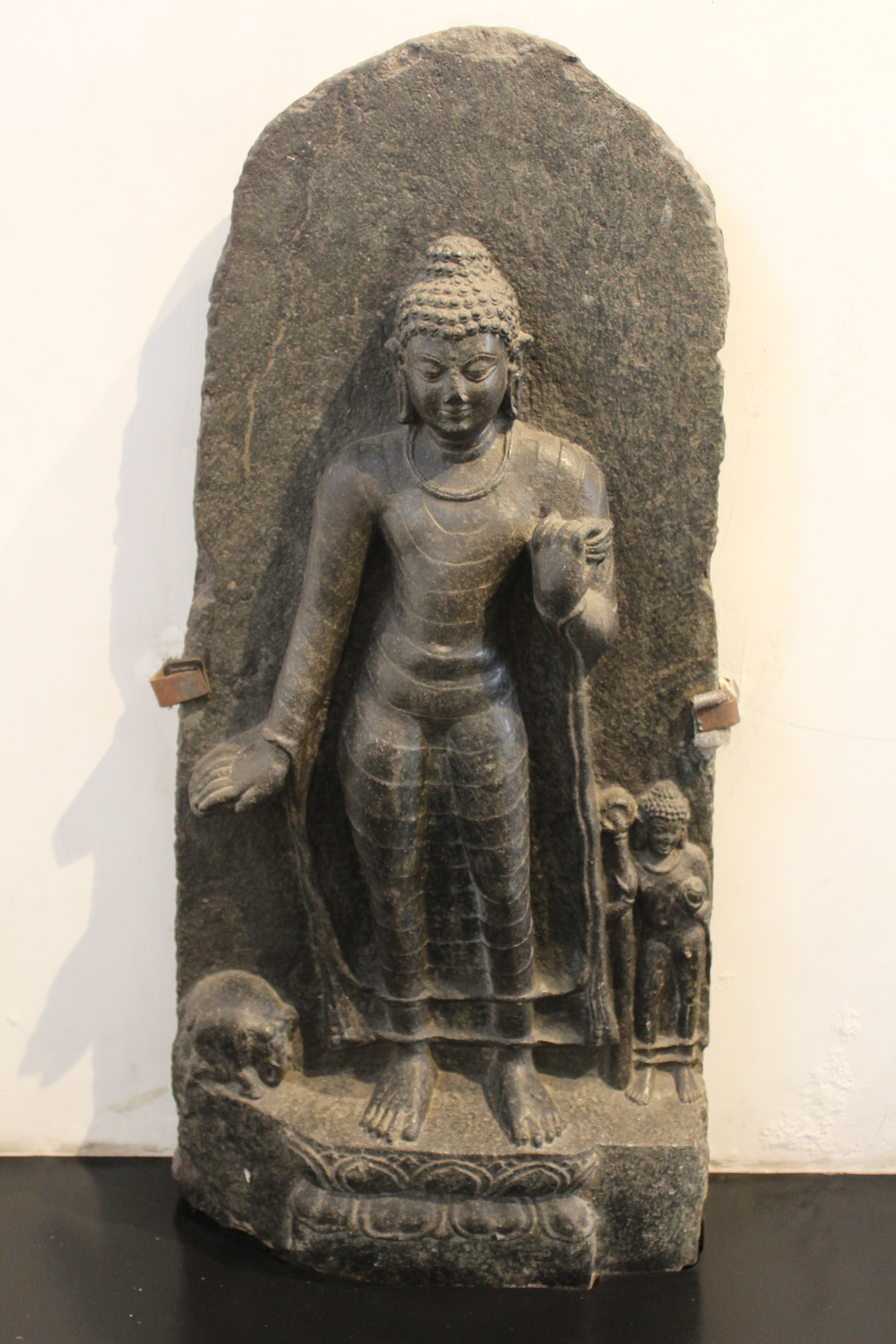
Taming Nalagiri the elephant, who appears at hedgehog size at left, with Ananda at right

=== Descent from Tavatimsa Heaven ===
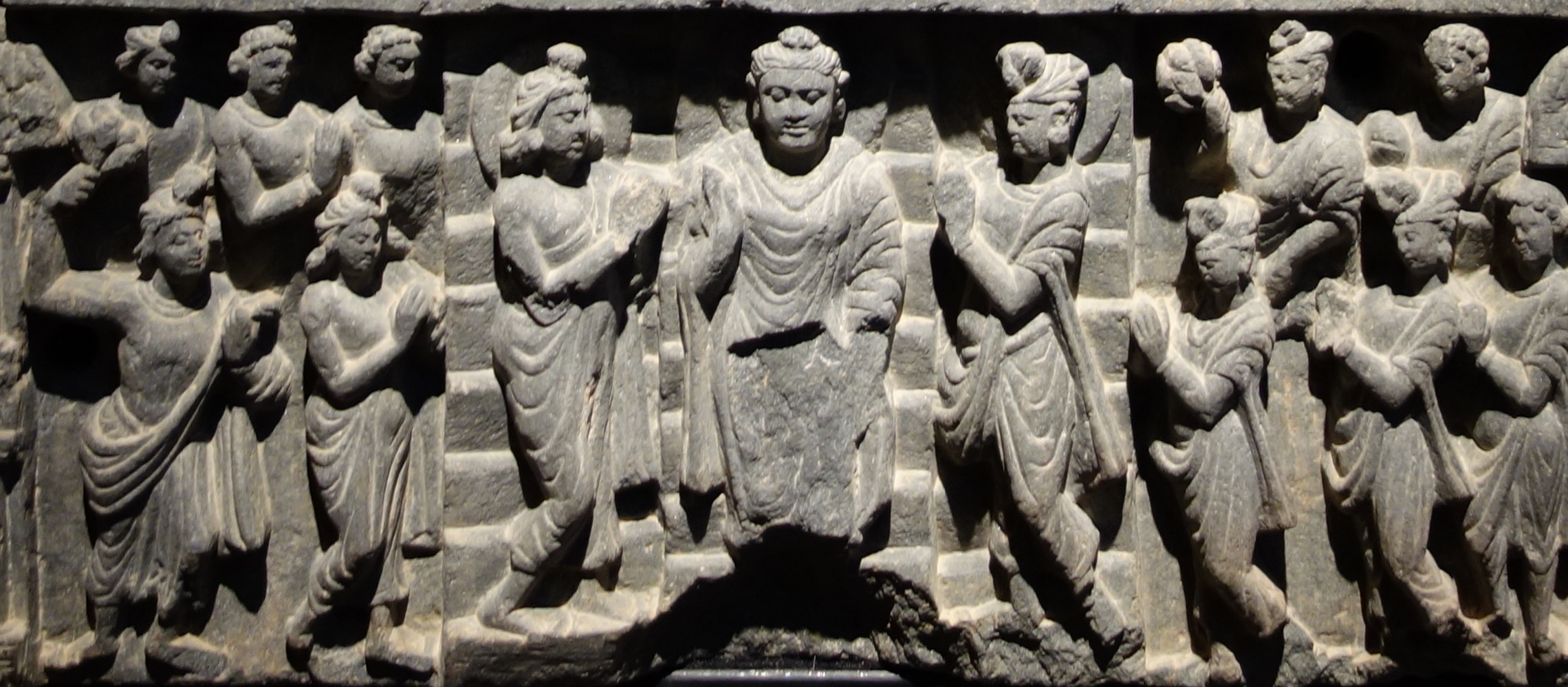
Descent from Tavatimsa Heaven, escorted by Indra and Brahma, 2nd–3rd century

One of the Eight Great Events. Some years after his enlightenment, Buddha visited the Tavatimsa heaven, where he was joined by his mother (from the Tushita heaven). For three months he taught her the Abhidhamma doctrine, before descending again to earth at Sankassa. Larger depictions show the Buddha descending the central one of three ladders or steps, often attended by Indra and Brahma, lords of the Tavatimsa heaven, who may remain at the top of any steps, but in simplified depictions they flank a standing Buddha on either side, at a much smaller scale, sometimes one holding a parasol over the Buddha. Buddha makes the varadamudra. A small figure of the nun Utpalavarana may be waiting for the Buddha below. The event is still celebrated in Tibet, in a festival called Lhabab Duchen.

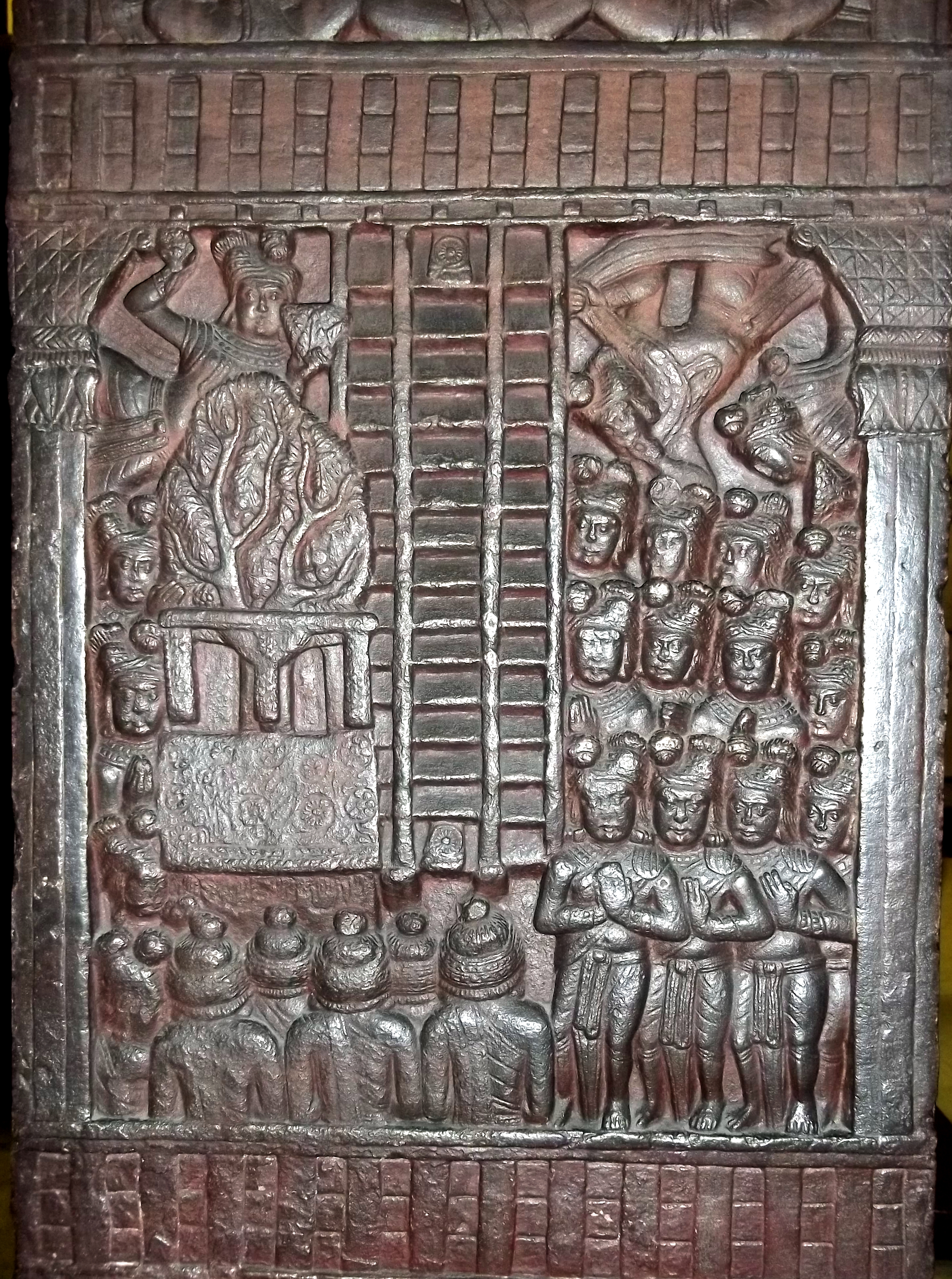
Descent from Tavatimsa Heaven, in Bharhut, 2nd–1st century BC (aniconic)

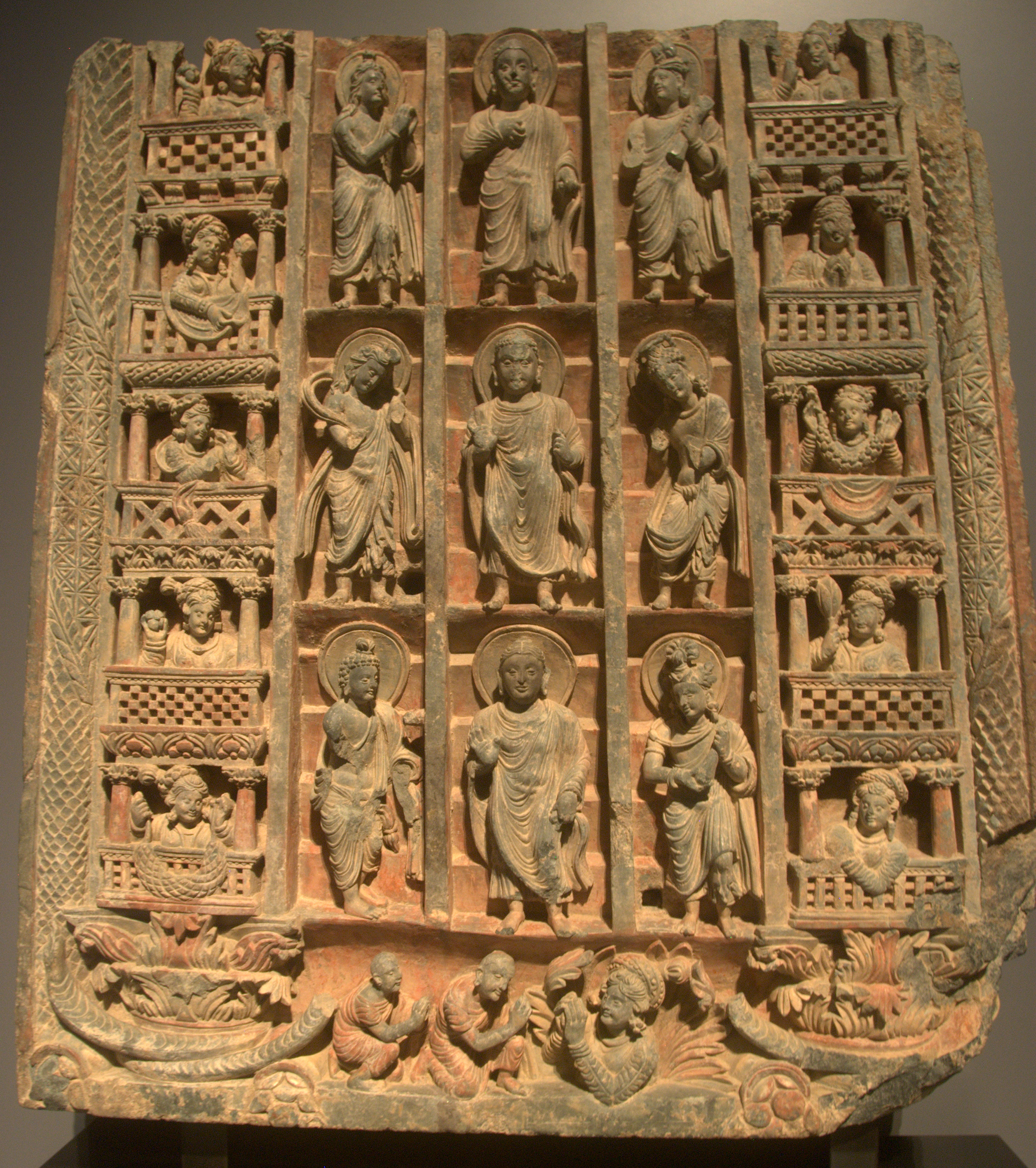
Descent from Tavatimsa Heaven, in the Greco-Buddhist art of Gandhara

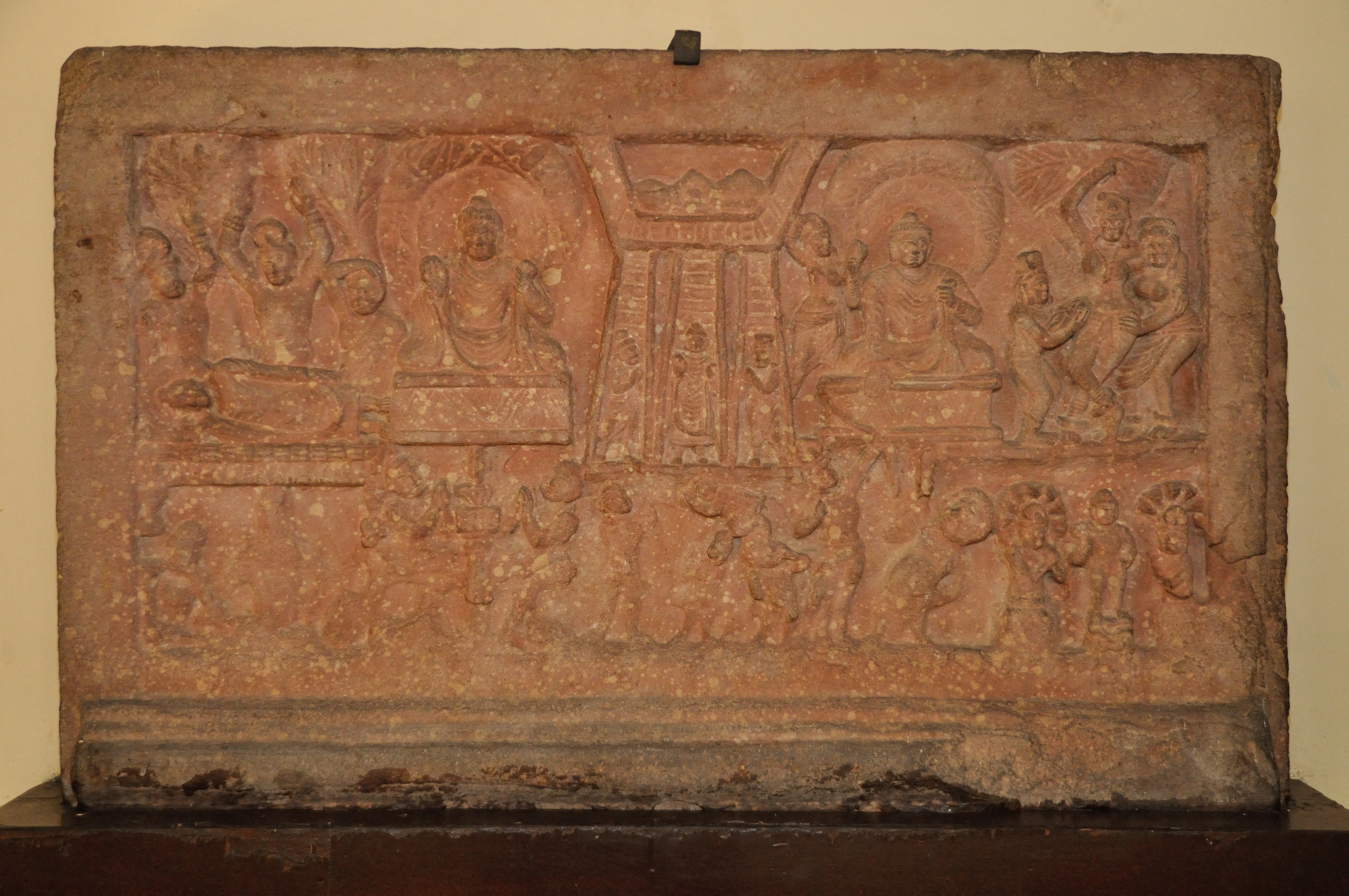
Descent from Tavatimsa Heaven (central scene), 2nd century AD, Mathura

=== Miracle at Shravasti ===
One of the Eight Great Events, this is also called the Twin Miracle, and was performed at Shravasti (Sravasti etc.). In a "miracle contest" with the Six Heretical Teachers, the Buddha performed two miracles. The first and more commonly depicted is known as the "multiplication of Buddhas", where Buddha baffles the others by multiplying his form into several Buddhas, who preach to the assembled crowd. In small pieces, however, only one Buddha figure may be shown.

In the other, Buddha makes flames rise up from his upper body, while water flows from the lower parts. The depiction indicates both elements by patterns on the relief, with the Buddha standing with his hand in the abhayamudra. Another miracle, with the miraculous growth of a mango tree, is shown in earlier reliefs at Sanchi, but not in depictions of the Eight Great Events.

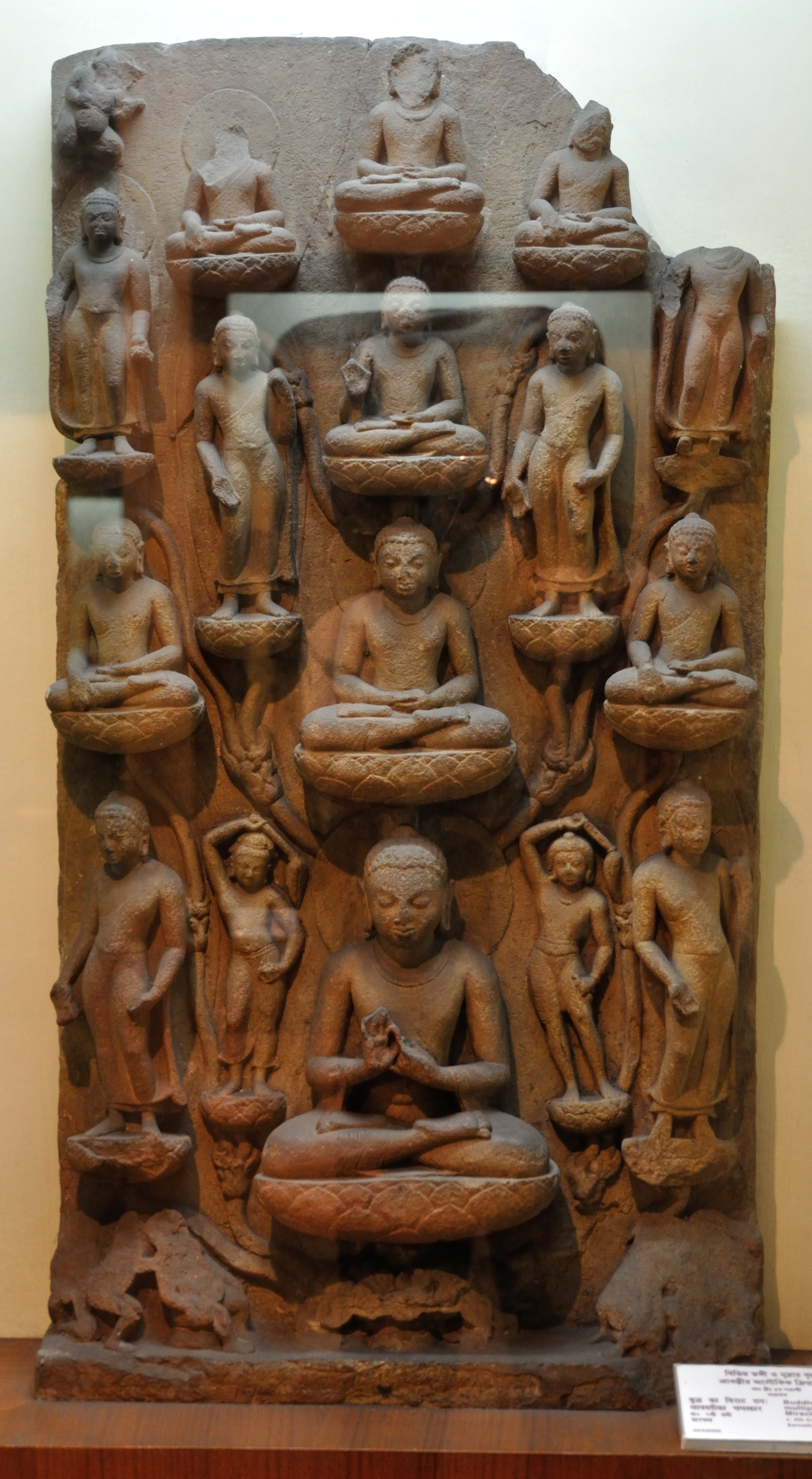
The Multiplication of Buddhas, Sarnath, 5th-century

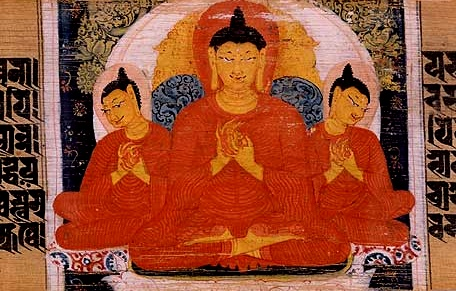
The Multiplication of Buddhas, manuscript illustration, Nalanda, after 700

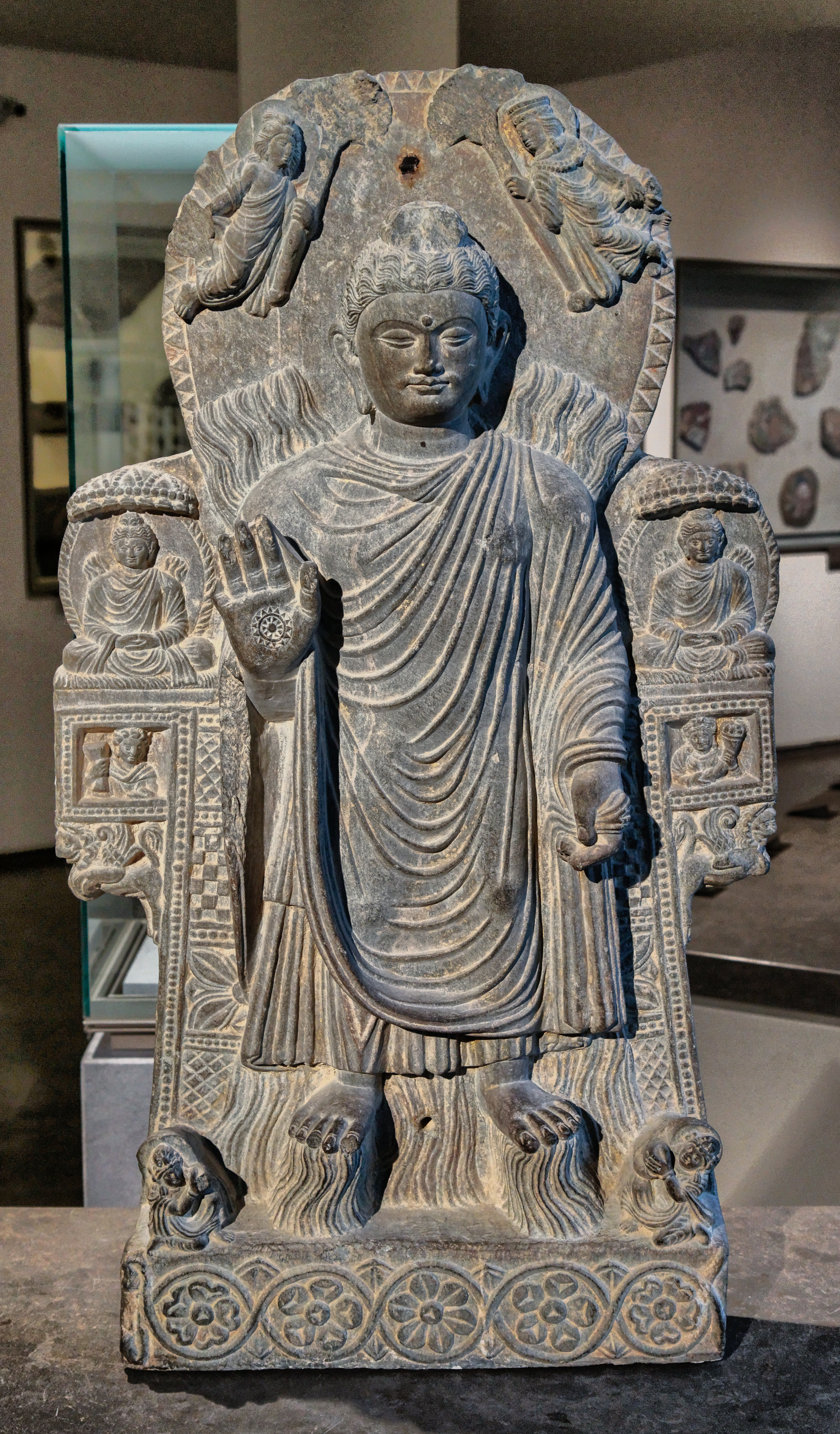
The miracle of fire and water, Gandhara, 3rd-century

=== Death of Buddha ===
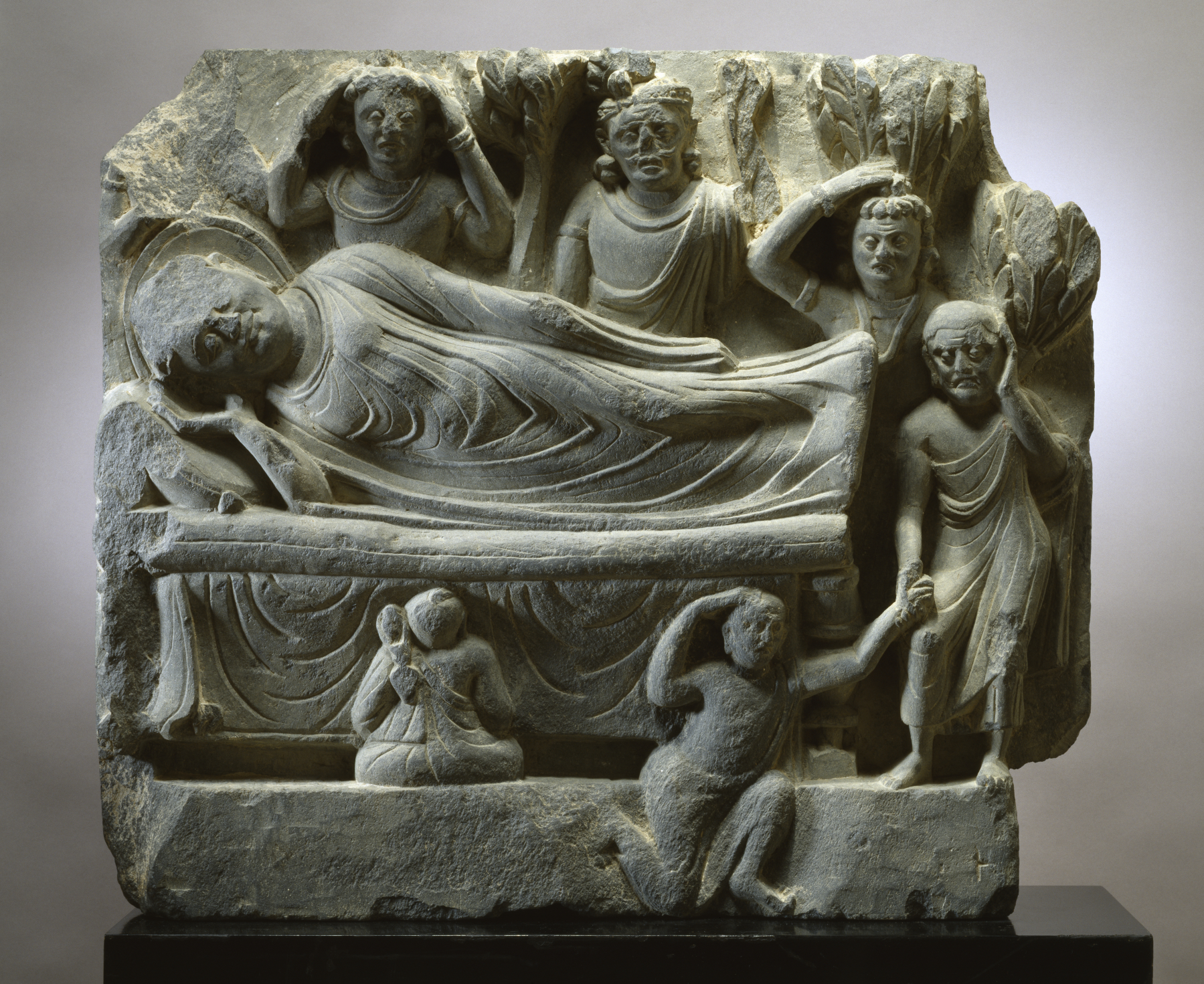
Death, Gandhara

This is the last of the Eight Great Events and included in all such groupings. It is also called the Parinirvana ("entry to nirvana"). It took place at Kushinagar, Uttar Pradesh. It is normally depicted in stele groups across the centre of the top, above the main figures, with a reclining Buddha with his head to the left, usually on a raised couch or bed. As many followers as space allow are crowded round the bed, in early versions making extravagant gestures of grief; these return in later Japanese paintings.

A rather small figure is often shown, typically facing out, sitting in front of the bed, usually in rather shallow relief; this is the Buddha's last convert, the ascetic Subhadra (or Sucandra). His water-sack suspended from a tripod or held in a cleft stick is ascetic equipment. He realizes that Buddha has attained final Nirvana, and does not show grief. Another monk at the front, sometimes being helped by a standing figure at the side, is Ananda, Buddha's cousin and closest companion. Sometimes a monk touches Buddha's feet.

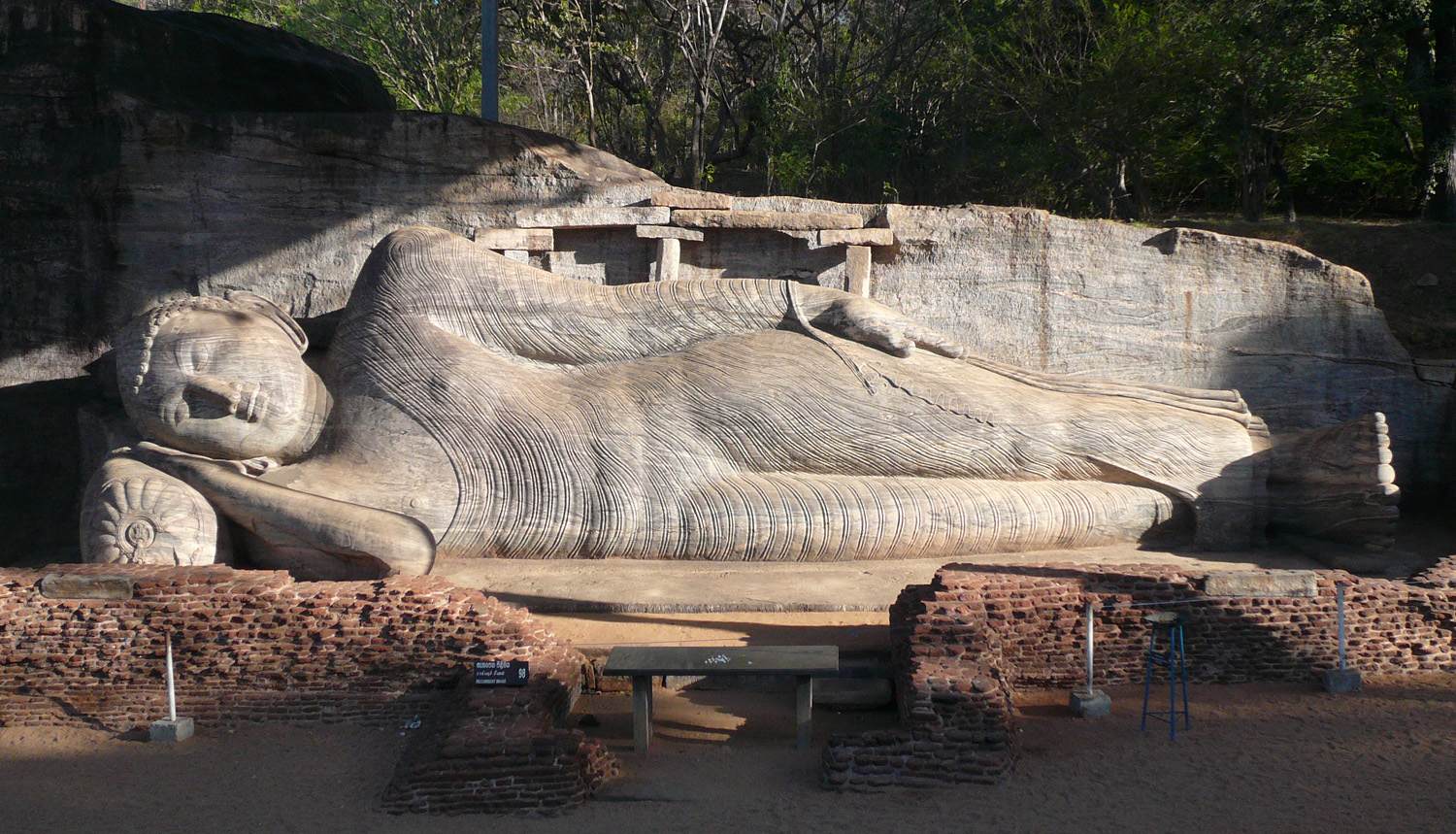
Rock-cut Reclining Buddha, Gal Vihara, Sri Lanka, 12th century

In Sri Lanka, artists often showed the Buddha alive and awake, but elsewhere the moment after death is usually represented. Sometimes the body is already wrapped in a shroud, but usually the face, as if asleep, is turned towards the viewer. Traditionally the death took place between two sal trees (the same species under which he was born), which may be shown behind him, as may their tree-spirits in the branches. The texts (the Pali Mahāparinibbāṇa Sutta and Sanskrit-based Mahāyāna Mahāparinirvāṇa Sūtra are the earliest) say he lived to be eighty, but he is shown as young, as he is in all depictions of him as an adult.

In Japan, where extensive narrative cycles barely exist, there are distinctive depictions of the Death (Nehan in Japanese), with large groups of human witnesses, surrounding a Buddha at a far larger scale, and (usually at the bottom of the picture space) a group of mixed species of animals. These were often displayed in temples when the death was commemorated each year. There is a quasi-parodic sub-genre (Yasai Nehan) of still-lifes of fruit and vegetables, representing a Parinnirvana scene. A 19th-century painting in the British Museum from the shunga erotic genre represents the persons present as penises and vulvas; other images show famous actors as the characters.

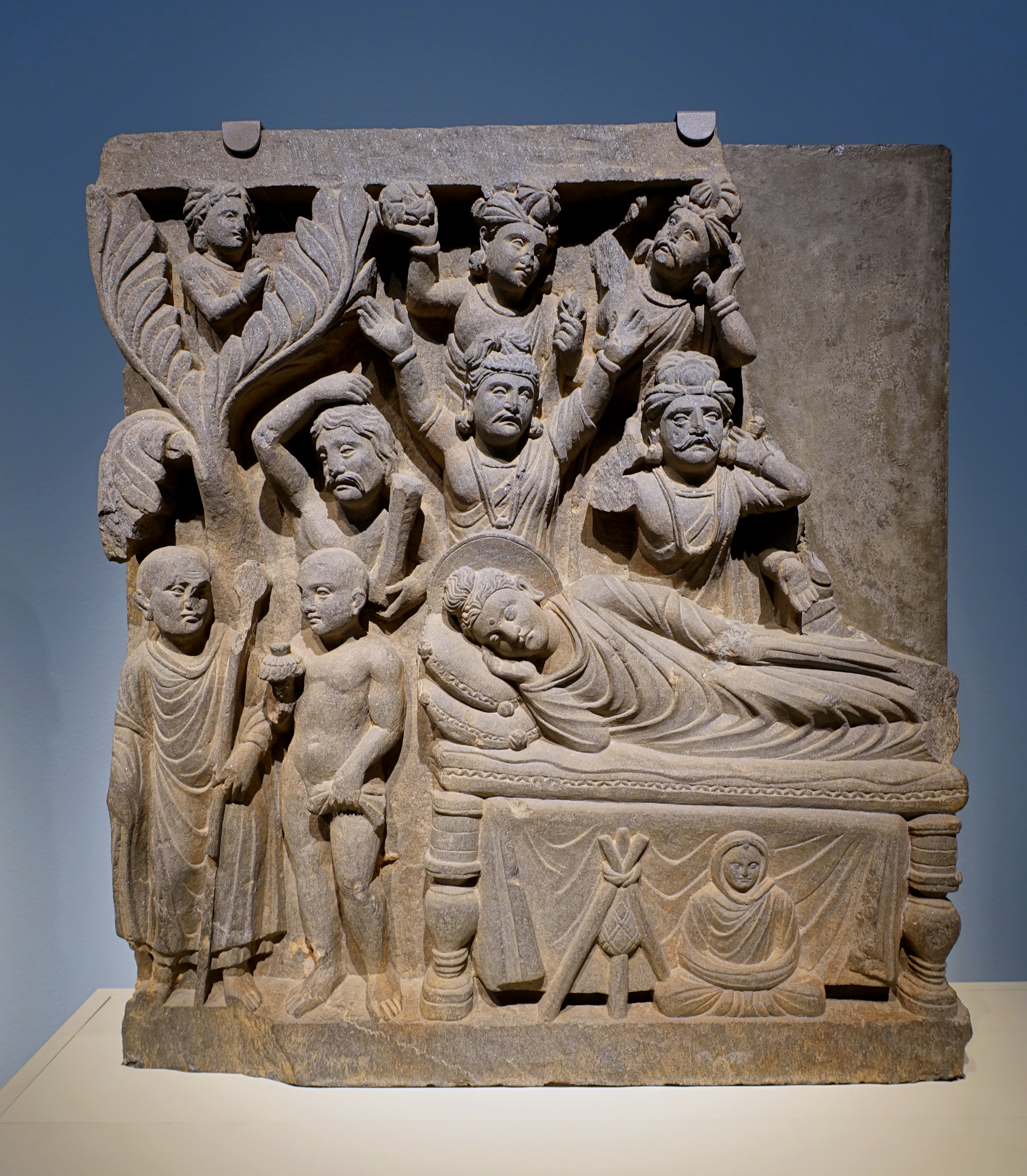
Parinirvana, Kushan dynasty, late 2nd to early 3rd century, Gandhara

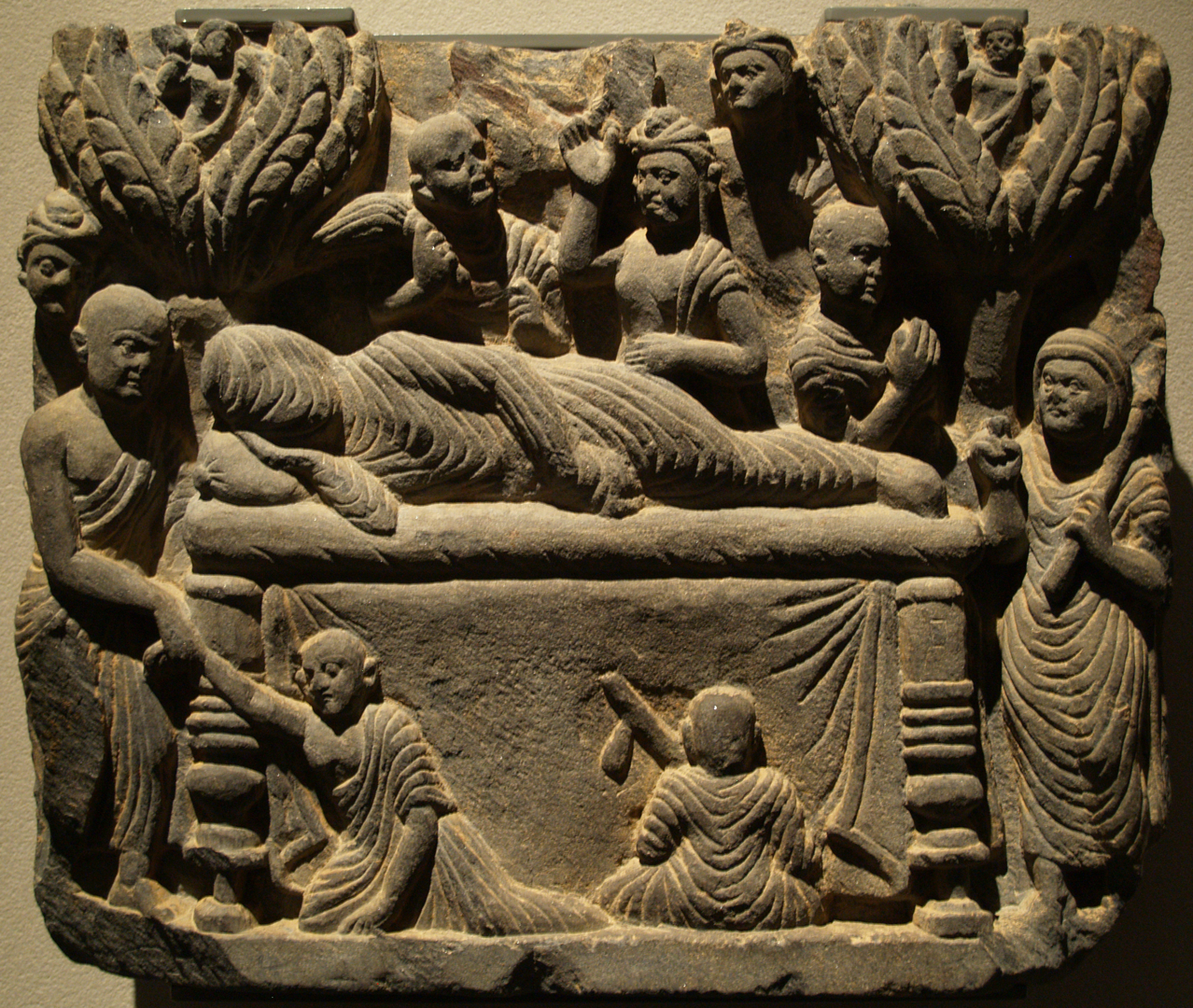
Gandhara. Shrouded Buddha, Subhadra, Ananda and tree-spirits

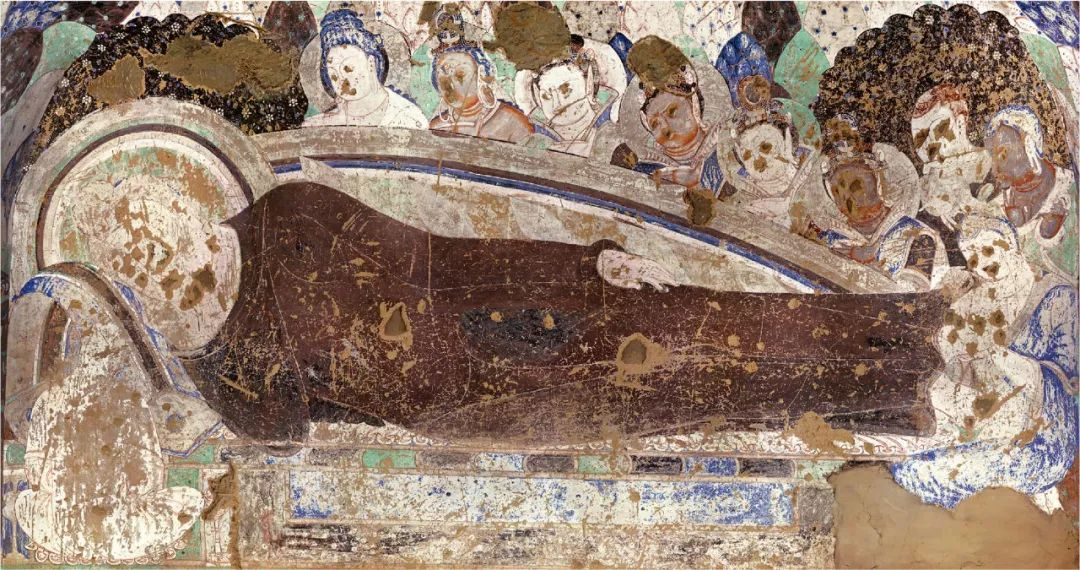
Parinirvana scene, Cave 38 at Kizil Caves, 4th century

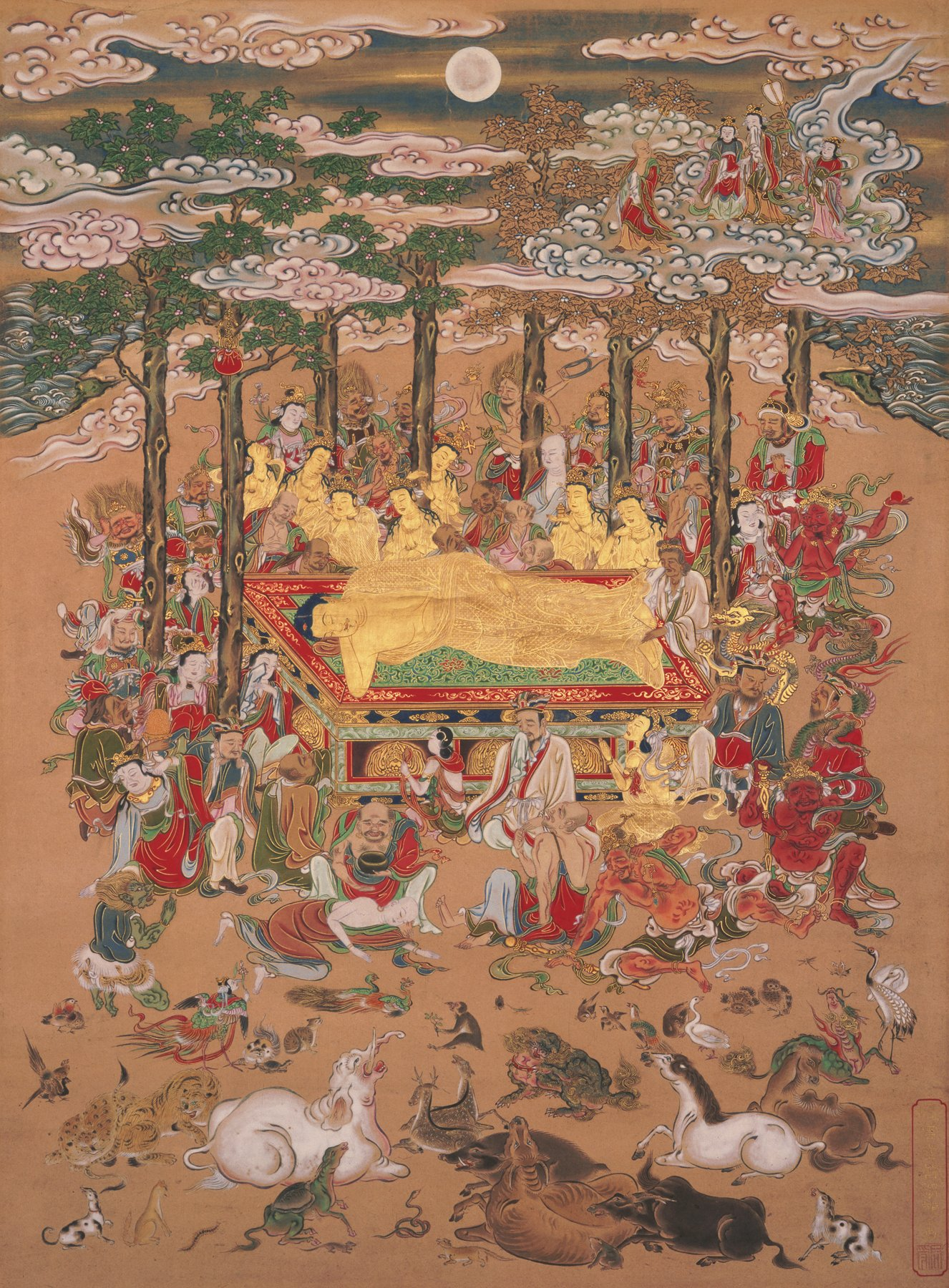
Japanese painting, with animals, by Hanabusa Itchō, before 1699

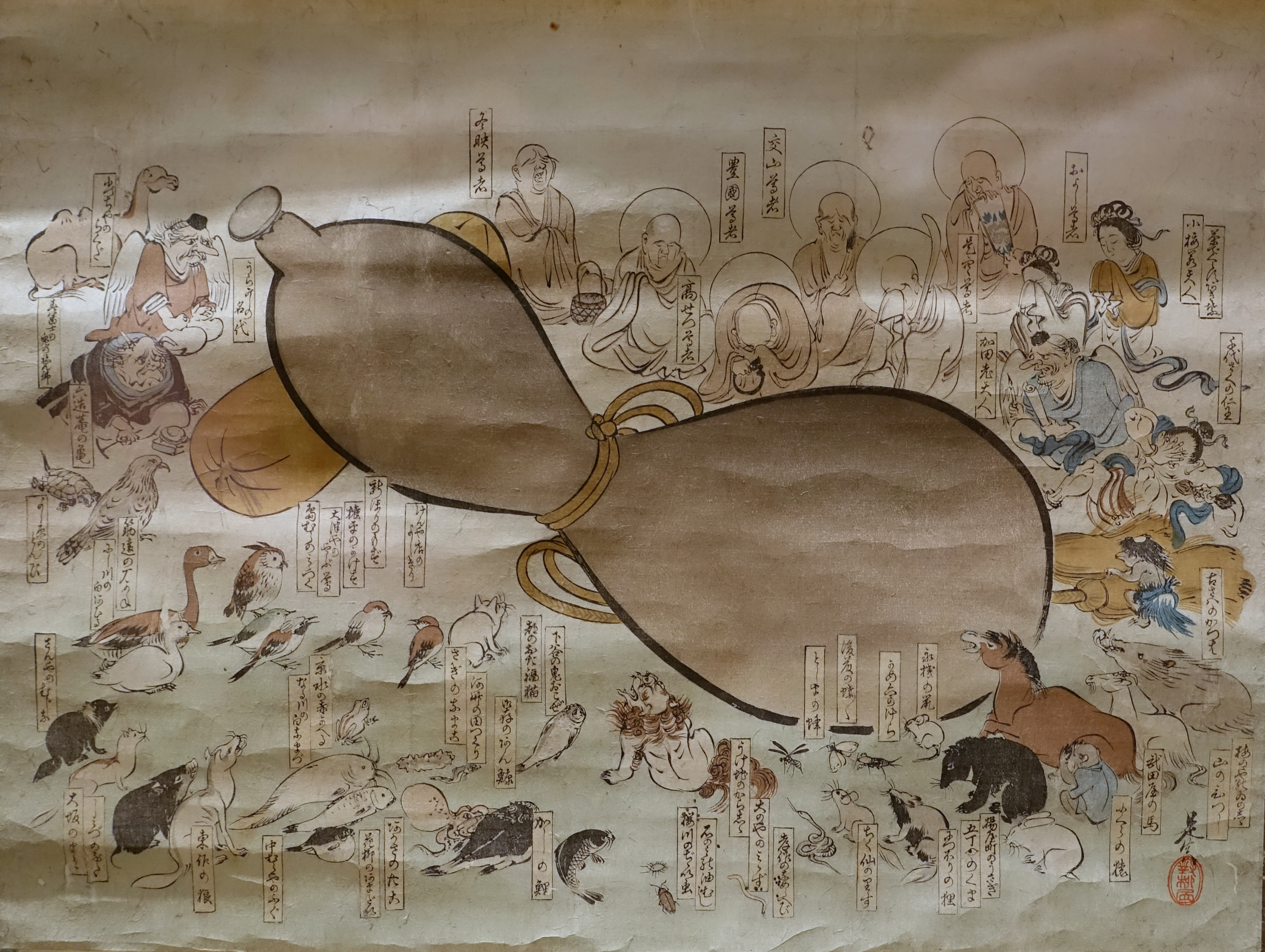
Mourning the Death of a Gourd, parody of the Parivirvana, Shibata Zeshin, 1854 or 1859

=== Cremation and division of the relics ===
The Buddha was cremated, which is a relatively uncommon scene in art. According to his instructions his ashes were divided and sent to a number of key sites, where they were interred in reliquaries under stupas. The Division of the Relics, supervised by a brahmin called Drona, is sometimes shown, as well as many scenes of them being worshipped, especially in Eastern India, where most were located. There was a dispute between the Buddha's Sakya clan, who claimed all the relics, and neighbouring groups, which briefly turned to conflict before a compromise was reached, again using Droma. A famous scene of the Civil War over the Relics is on a Sanchi gateway crossbar.

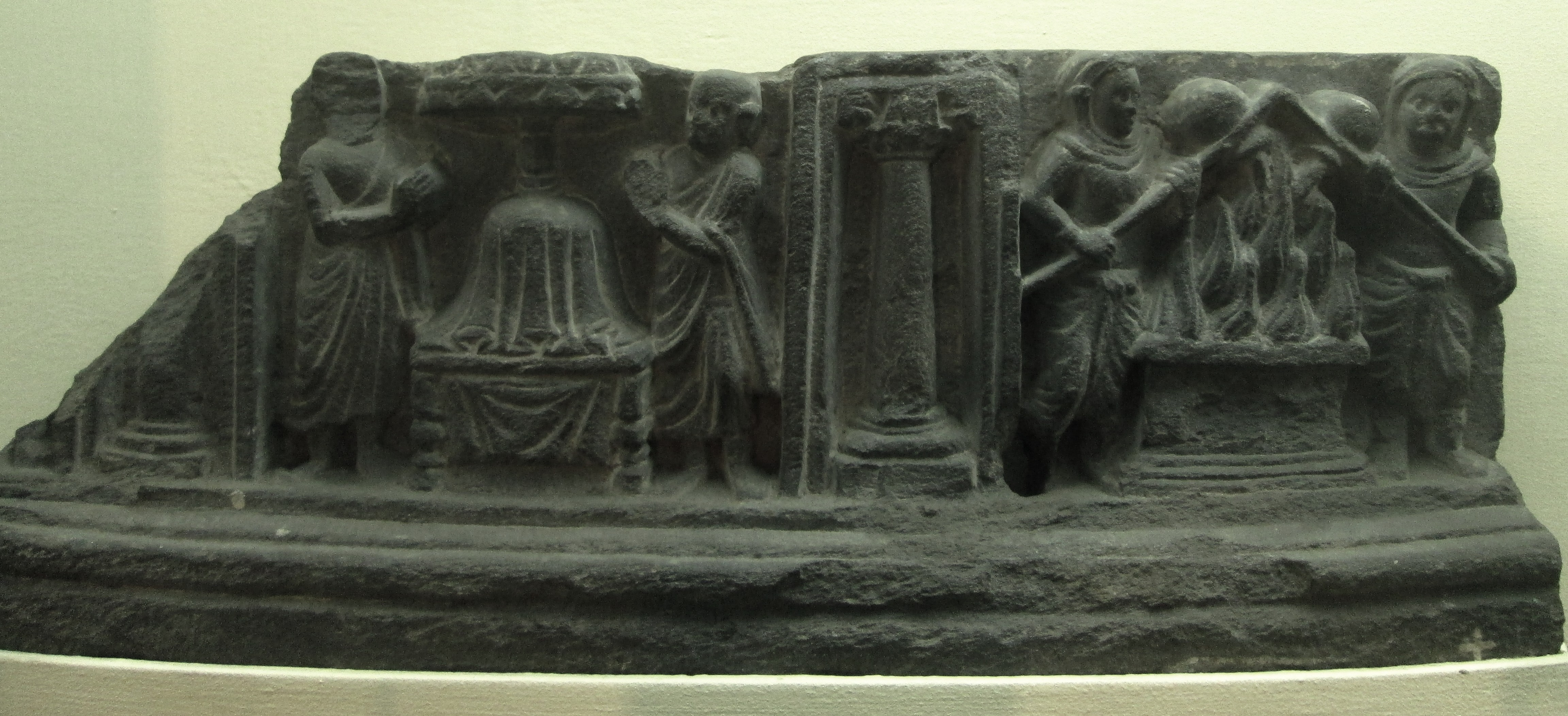
Cremation of Buddha, Gandhara

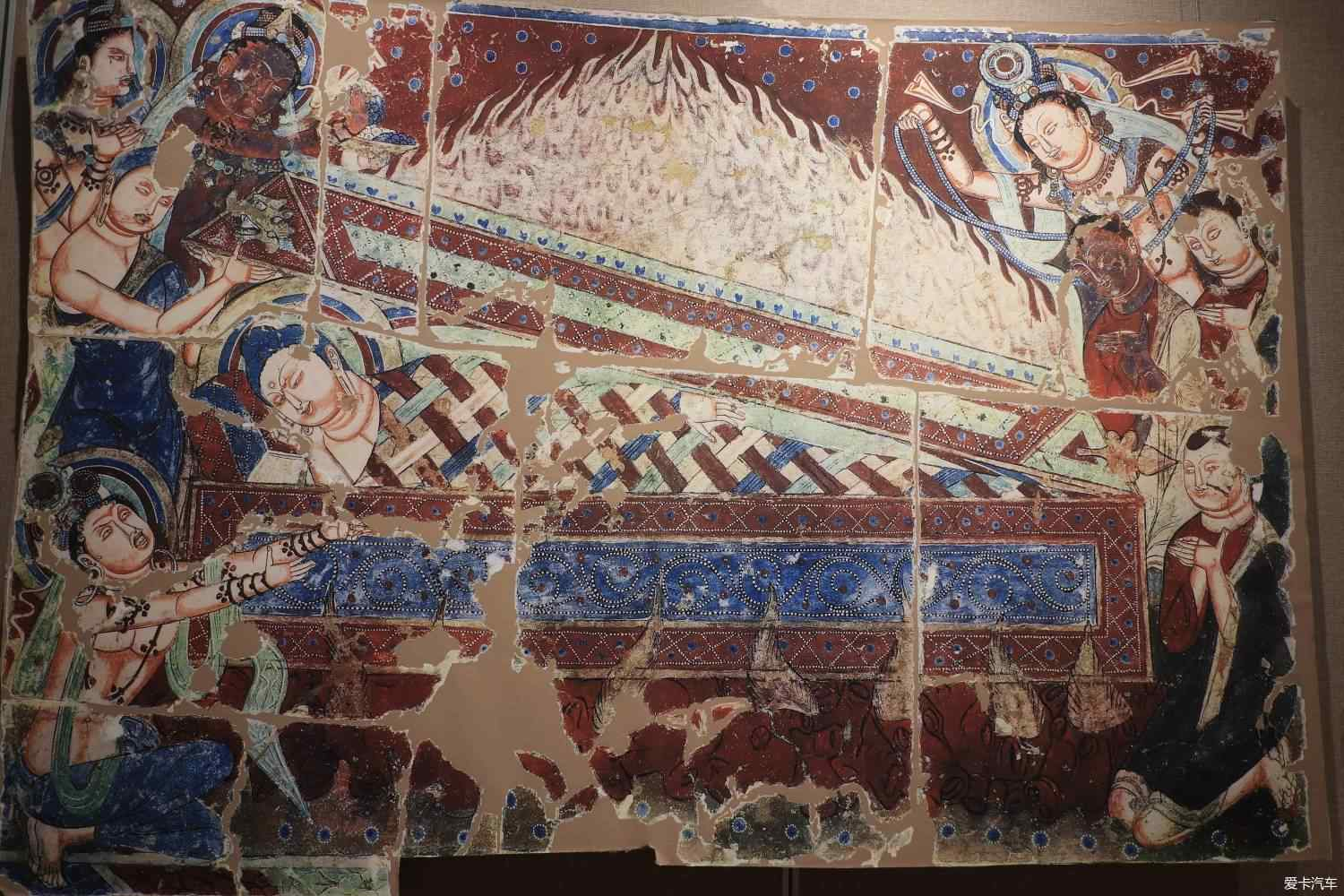
Cremation of the Buddha, Māyā Cave, Kizil Caves, end 6th century

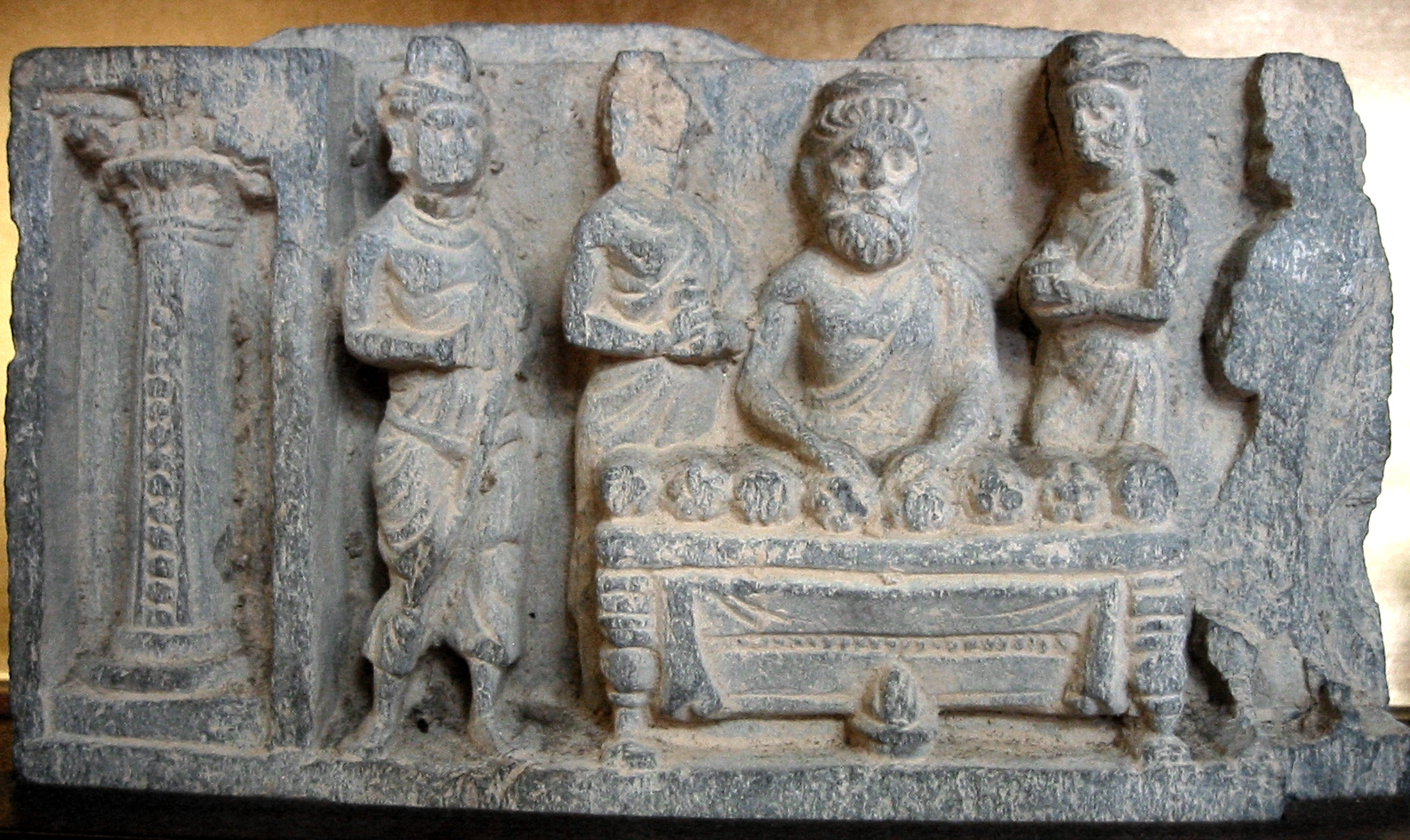
Division of the relics, supervised by Droma

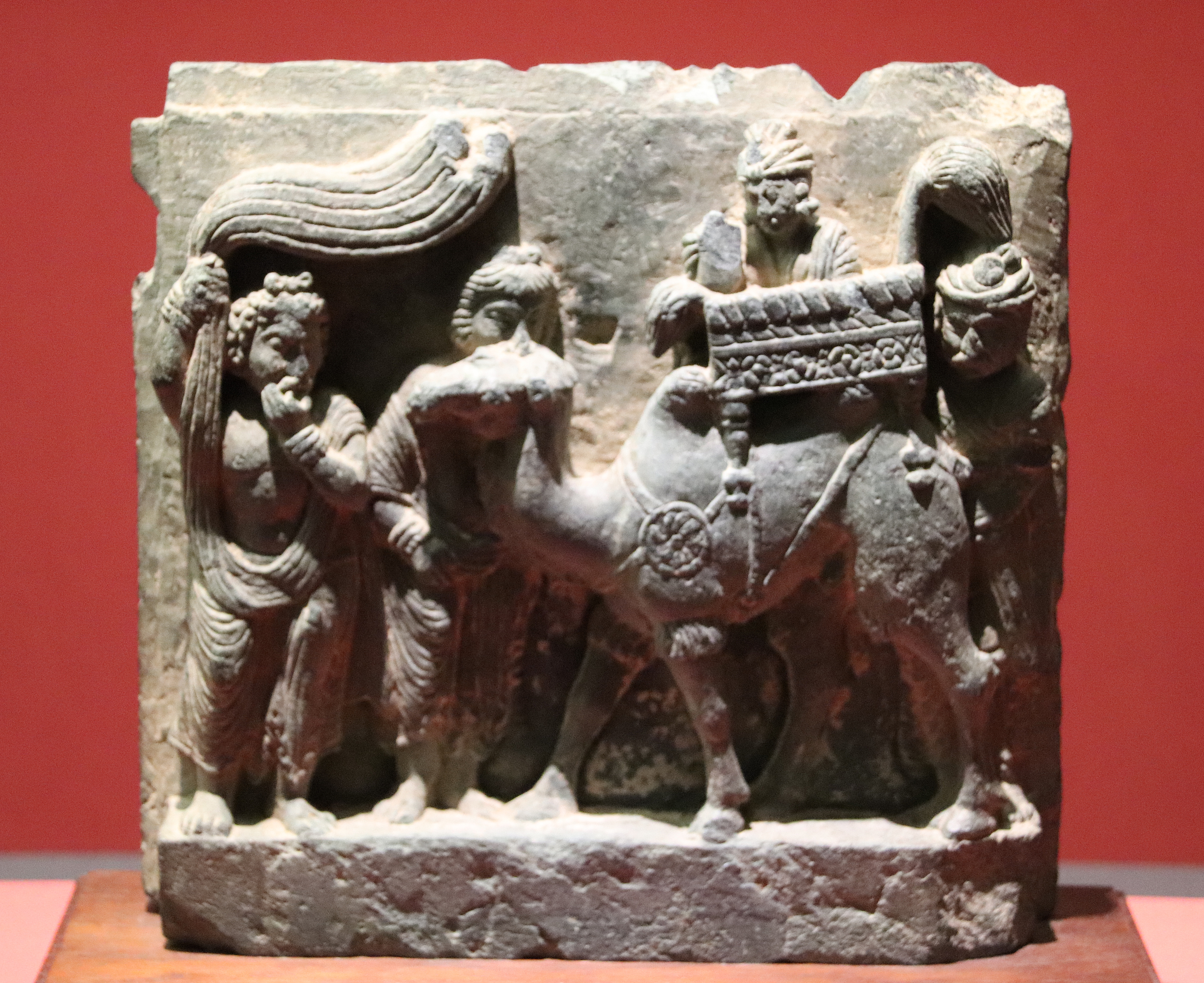
Transporting Buddha's Relics, 2nd–4th century

== Art history ==
=== Early aniconic representations ===
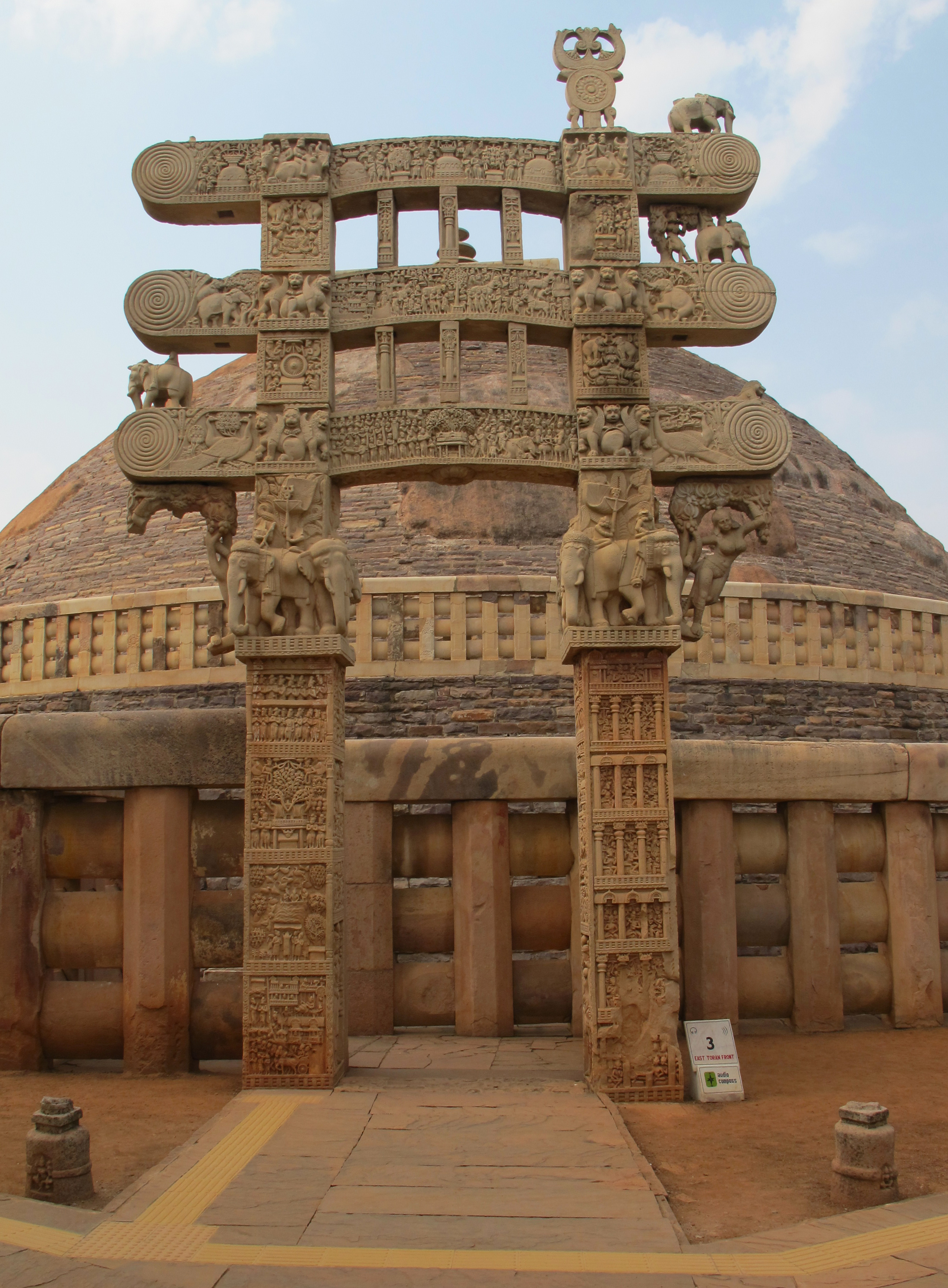
Sanchi, Stupa 1, east gateway, railings (here undecorated) and stupa behind

The earliest representations followed the general avoidance of depicting the Buddha. This was in no way a general aniconism, and many scenes are crowded with other figures, some identifiable and others staffage. The location of the Buddha can be inferred from a gap, usually in the centre, of these crowded images. A scene of the Dream of Queen Maya will lack the elephant, and one of The Great Departure will have a riderless horse, surrounded by the usual crowd of heavenly figures. This phase, seen at the stupas at Bharhut (now all in museums), Sanchi (main, "Stupa I"), and early pieces at Amaravarti, as well as some Gandharan pieces, lasted until the first century AD, with some aniconic images later. Apart from the absence of the main figure, many images are very similar in composition to later ones with the figure. Of Bharhut, Claudine Bautze-Picron says "what is depicted here enters the Buddhist iconography for ever".

=== Grouping, and narrative method ===
The numerous images at on the gateways at Sanchi mix up scenes from the last and previous lives of the Buddha, as well as later worship, repeat popular scenes, and are apparently arranged randomly, rather than chronologically or with any particular meaning to the sequence. This is thought to be the result of different scenes being commissioned and therefore chosen by different individuals or groups. At Bharut terse inscriptions identify the scenes, but not at Sanchi. It is likely that monks offered pilgrims guided tours of the scenes.

Most of the Gandharan scenes were not excavated in a systematic manner, and many pieces had been attacked and damaged, and it is often hard to know what the overall scheme was. At Borobudor the full scheme remains in position, and follows a surviving biography closely and in sequence (there are some differences, probably because the exact version of the text used has not survived).

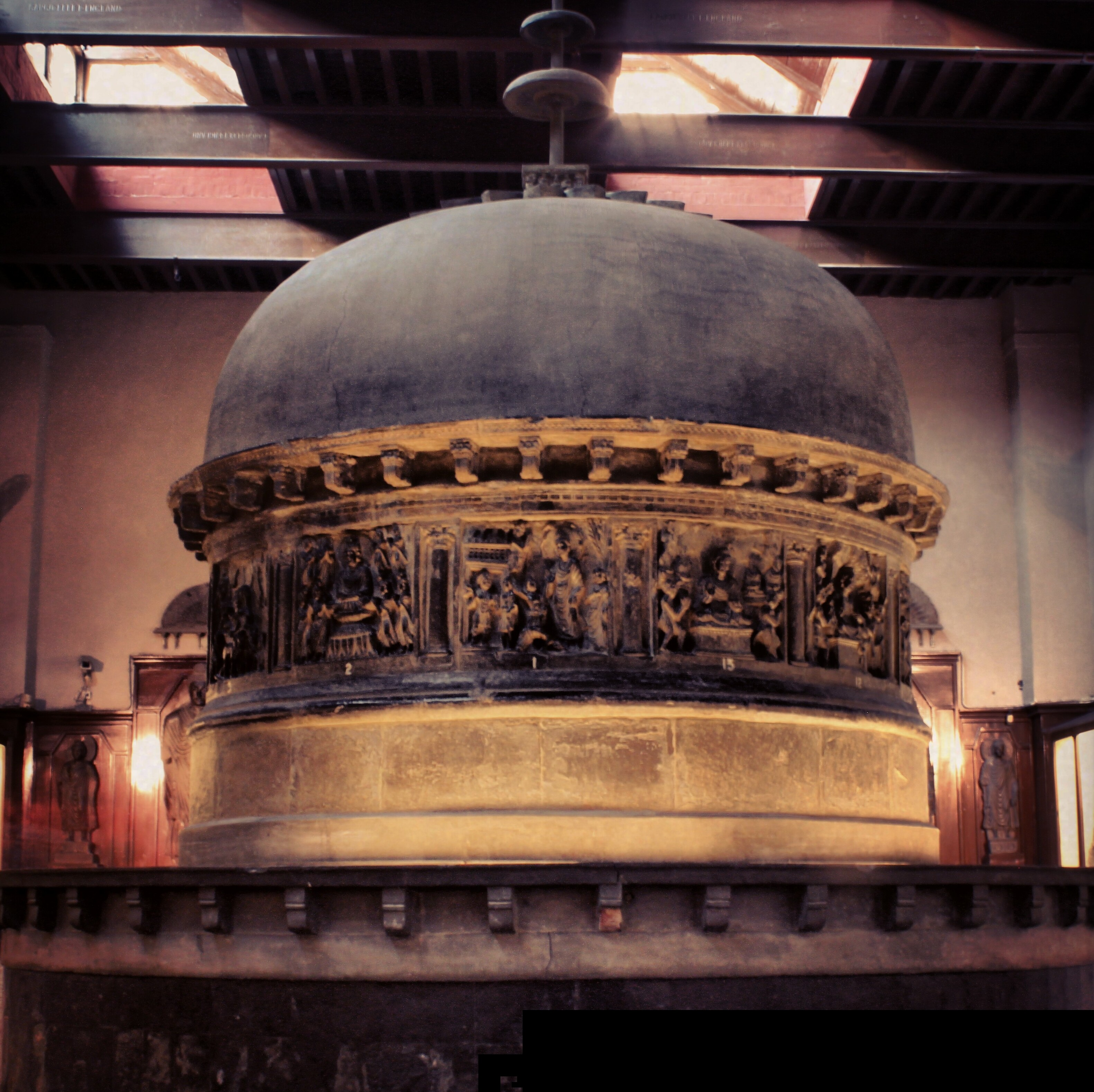
The Sikri stupa, Gandharan, largely a reconstruction, apart from the middle section, with 13 scenes from Buddha's life

The Gandharan method of telling the story in a number of separate scenes, clearly demarcated by frames or columns, is a "definite borrowing from Roman art"; it is seen in depictions of imperial careers. It is different from the "continuous narration" seen in earlier Indian art, and that from other regions, with figures appearing more than once, and episodes blending into each other. The Gandharan reliefs decorated the sides of stupas, and walls, railings and even the risers of stairs around them. Restricted space reduced the number of figures in many to a few figures, but larger panels may contain many, as do the reliefs from the eastern side of India.

=== Locations of reliefs ===
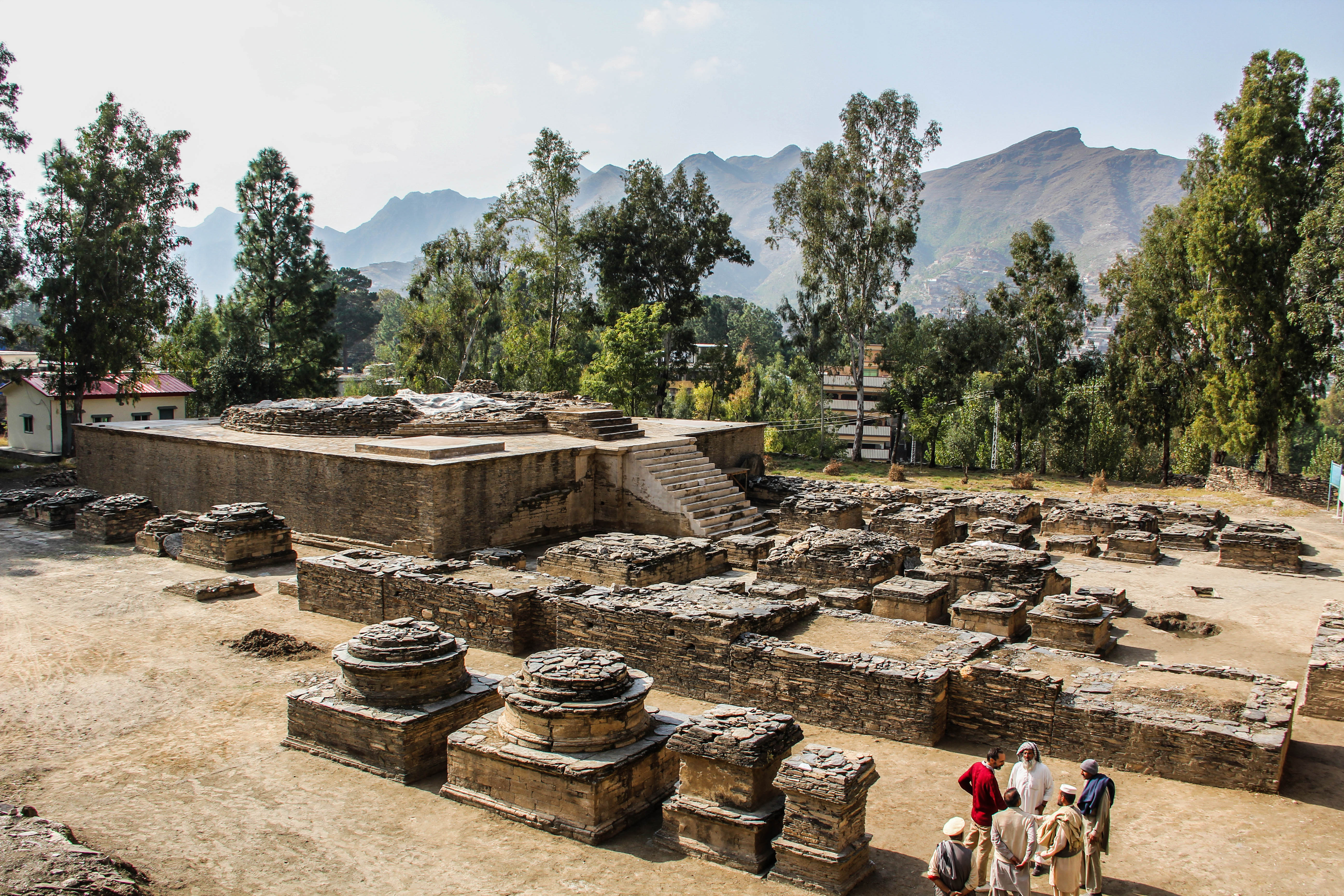
Bases for one large and several small ruined stupas at the Saidu Sharif Stupa, Swat District, Pakistan, formerly Gandhara

At Indian stupa sites such as Barhut, Sanchi, and (to a lesser extent) Amaravati the placing of the surviving images around the stupa drum or on the railings and torana gateways is relatively clear from the best preserved sections. At Borobudor the whole monument is relatively intact. But very little sculpture survives in situ from the Gandharan structures and what did has been liable to destructive iconoclasm, earthquakes and reuse up to the present).

The Gandharan sites were rather different from the early Indian ones, and offered many places for sculpture. After an early period following the massive low domes of India, after about 100 AD the main Gandharan stupas usually had a high square base, topped by a round section with a vertical wall, then a dome on top of that. Apart from large outside stupas, there were many smaller stupas either outside or built in a small shrine chamber off a larger room, mostly votive offerings. These developed a complicated arrangement of bands or zones around the stupa, all decorated differently. There might be a projecting flat "false gable" section at the front. Sculpture could decorate most stupa surfaces, but it is likely that many of the best-preserved small panels come from the drums of smaller stupas in a shrine room. A set of reliefs running round a smallish stupa might require "about eight to twenty life scenes". The choice was made by the commissioner, no doubt often with monastic advice, and many sets chose to illustrate a particular period of the Buddha's life.

In the main large stupas there were wide steps rising to the top of the square base, and the vertical "riser" spaces of these were another location for sculpture. In some cases the triangular spaces at the sides created by each step also had carved reliefs, though these mostly did not feature religious scenes, but grotesques, monsters or garlands.

Small reliefs, light enough to take on travels, were made as folding diptychs for monks or well-off lay persons. Two scenes on each wing was one common arrangement, often with the four main events.

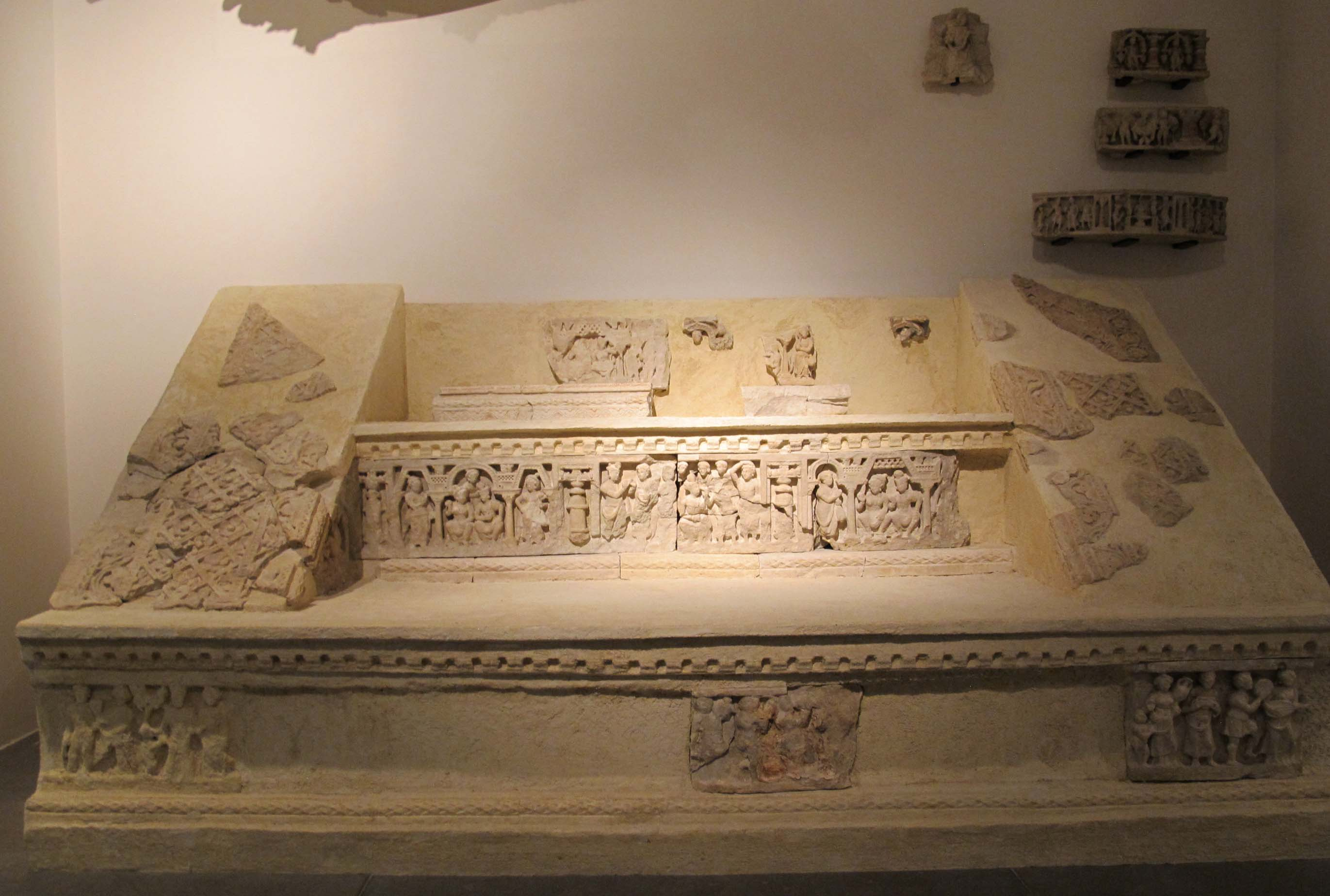
Reconstruction of stupa stairway from Hadda, Afghanistan

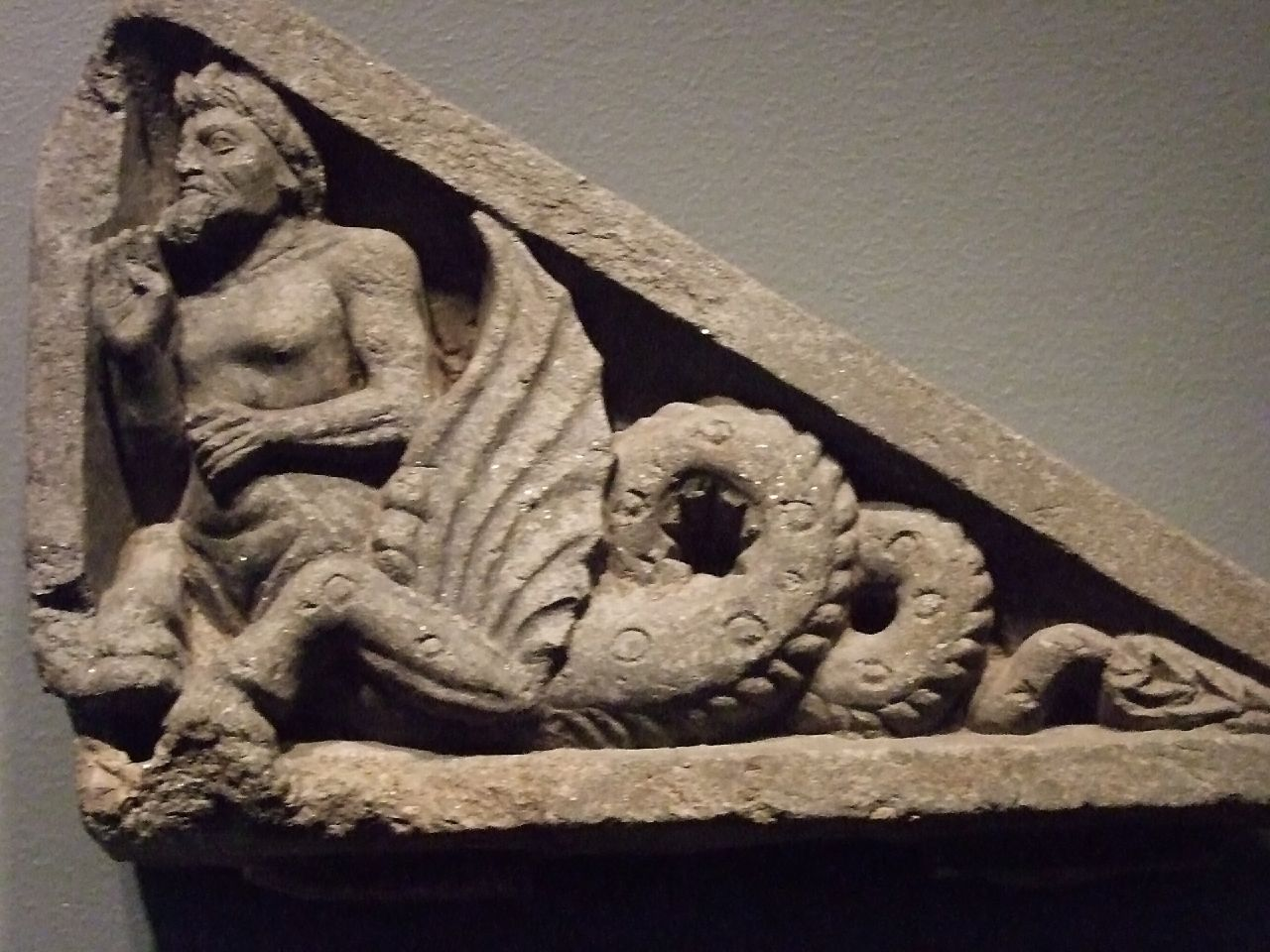
Side panel from a stairway, with "centaur-sea serpent", Gandhara

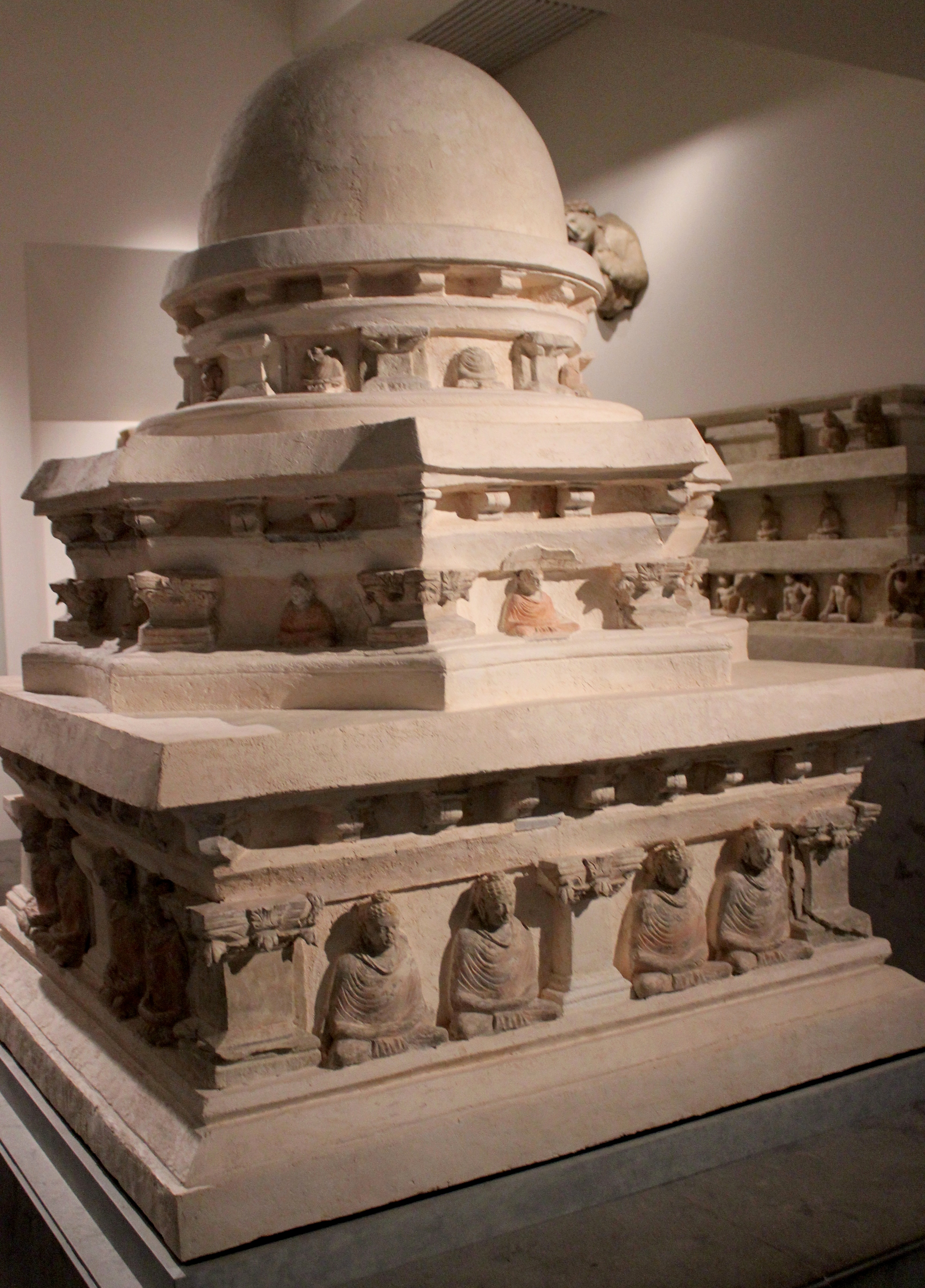
Small stupa from Hadda, Afghanistan

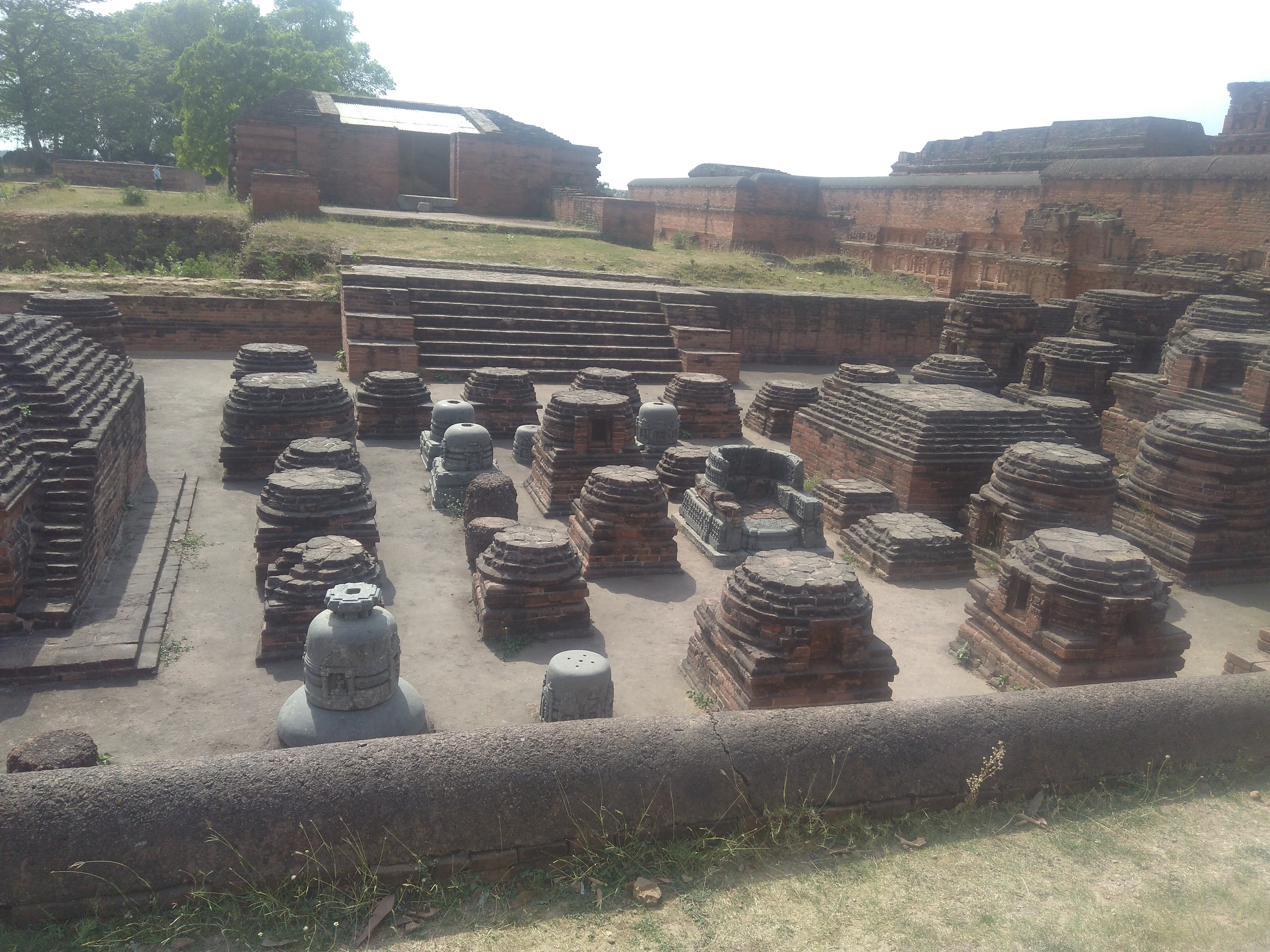
Bases of small votive stupas at Nalanda

=== Rises and falls of narrative imagery ===
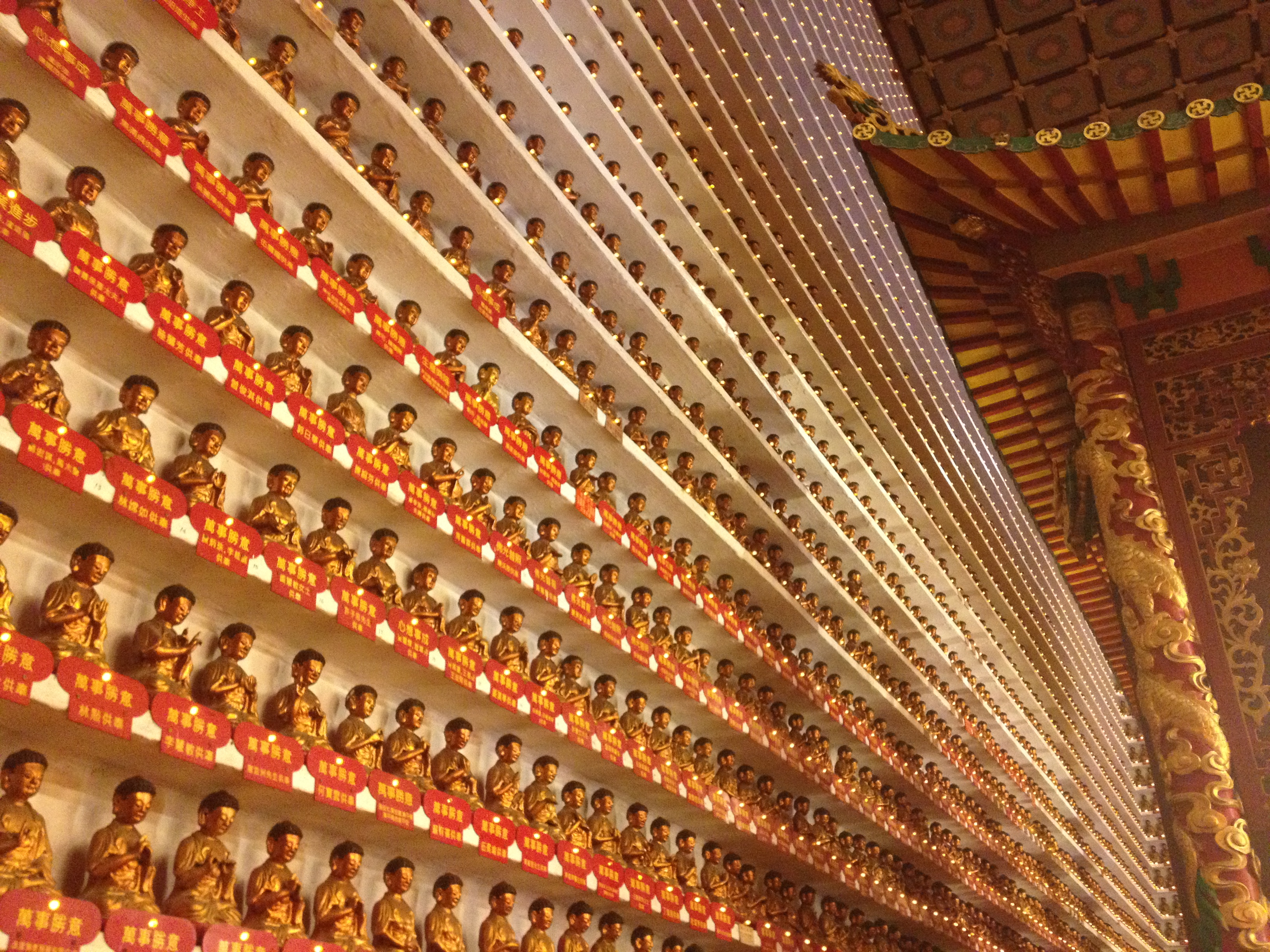
A wall of "Ten Thousand Buddha" small statues, Ten Thousand Buddhas Monastery, Hong Kong

At various periods narrative images of Buddha's life decline or disappear from the surviving record over wide areas. For early periods, this is undoubtedly affected by the great majority of survivals being stone sculpture, while manuscripts, mural paintings and wood sculpture have almost all been lost. The Indian tradition of Buddhist paintings on cloth (pata) has left no survivals, but its descendents can undoubtedly be seen in the thankas of Tibetan and Himalayan art, especially earlier ones.

In India, large reliefs or free-standing statues of the Buddha appear at the same time, or just a little later, as narrative reliefs, and before long these are often "Buddhist triads" with two smaller figures flanking the main Buddha, representing bodhisattvas or other Buddhas. After a few centuries images of these figures by themselves become popular, and eventually more common than those of Gautama Buddha in many areas where Mahayana Buddhism dominated, reflecting changes in Buddhist thought and meditational and devotional practice.

Another factor behind the replacement of narrative images was that the commissioning of images of Buddha was believed to accrue merit, and many Buddhists took the view that commissioning numerous small Buddha images was better for this than fewer large ones. Already in Gandhara, rows of small meditating Buddhas can be seen running around stupas. Later the "Thousand Buddhas" style became very popular, with large grids of small figures. These are very common in surviving Chinese murals, and on a smaller scale in manuscripts. Sometimes the Buddhas are identical, but in other works they vary in their mudras and other small details.

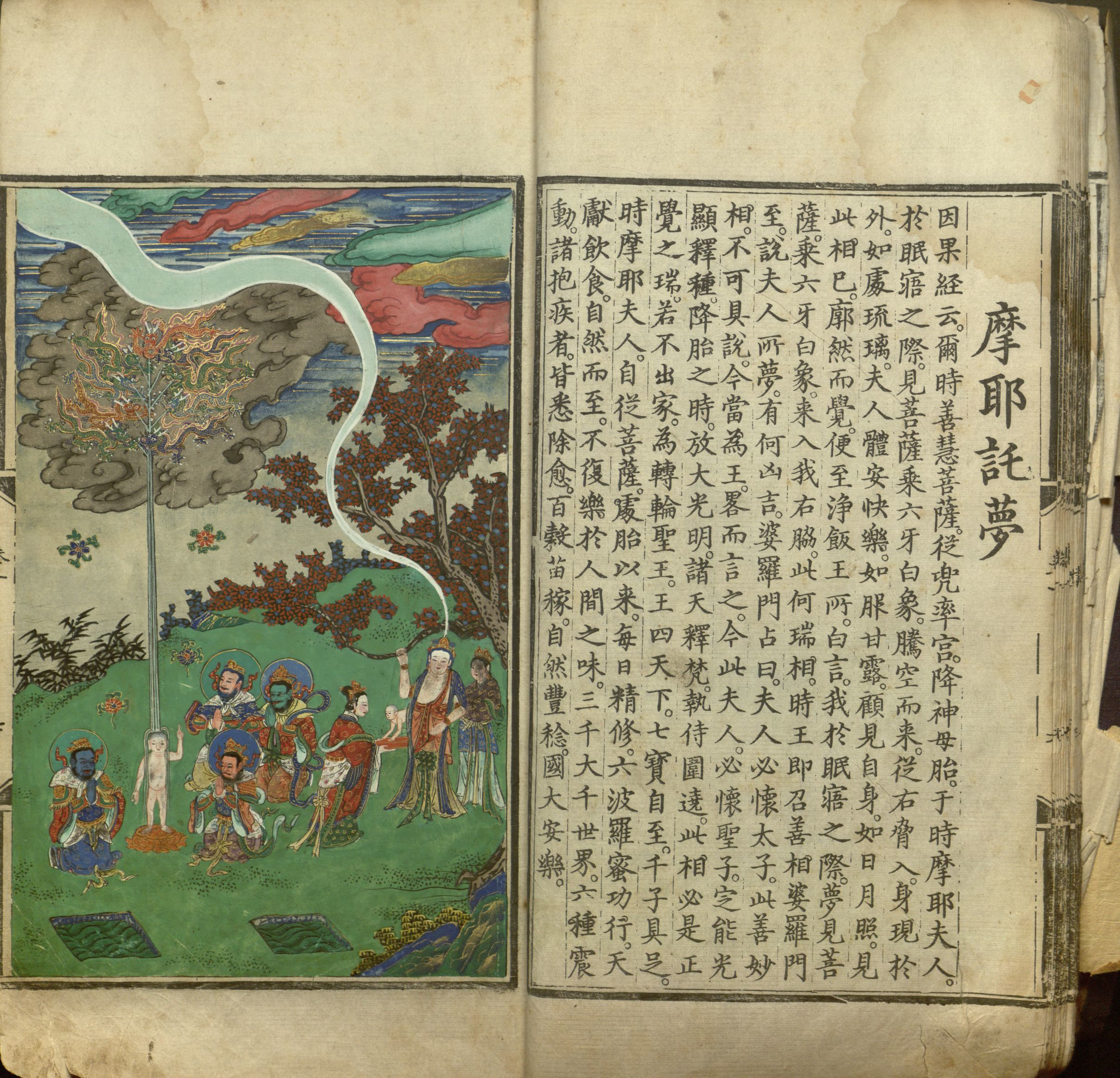
Birth, from Baocheng's printed book, China, c. 1465–1487

In Theravada Buddhism the emphasis on Gautama Buddha remained strong, and narrative images of his life have remained popular where there is a suitable location. Apart from the huge cycle at Borobudor, there is a large cycle of reliefs in niches inside the Ananda Temple in Bagan, Myanmar probably from not long after 1105. Japanese Buddhist art lacks narrative cycles until the last two centuries, and concentrates, mostly in painting or prints, on a small number of incidents, some of which are effectively of Japanese origin. Apart from the pointing baby Buddha, Shakyamuni Descending from the Mountain and the Parinnirvana, discussed above, there are depictions of Buddha preaching.

The arrival of printing a new medium for illustrations of biographical writings, often for a popular market. Some of the first were for a biography by a monk called Baocheng (寶成, otherwise unknown) in Ming dynasty China, probably first published between 1422 and 1425. The biography was the first two volumes in a large work of four volumes that went on to give a history of Buddhism, especially in China, which was re-issued in various rather different blockprinted editions until the early 19th century. An edition of c. 1465–1487 has 100 illustrations in each volume, hand-coloured in the copy in the Library of Congress.

== See also ==
- Buddha in art
- Buddhānussati
- Buddha footprint
- Eight Great Events
- Iconography of Gautama Buddha in Laos and Thailand
- Miracles of Gautama Buddha
- Relics associated with Buddha
