= Vasudeva Sharan Agrawala =

Indian writer

- Born: 7 August 1904; Meerut district
- Died: 27 July 1967 (aged 62); Varanasi
- Education: M. A. (Lucknow) 1929; Ph. D. (Lucknow) 1941; D. Litt. (Lucknow) 1946. (advisor for both Radha Kumud Mukherjee)
- Occupations: Cultural history, Sanskrit and Hindi literature, numismatics, museology, and art history.
- Writing career
- Language: Hindi, Sanskrit, Prakrit, English.
- Years active: 1933–1966
- Notable works: The Heritage of Indian Art, New Delhi: Publications Division, Ministry of Information and Broadcasting, 1964.; India as known to Panini: A study of the cultural material in Ashtadhyayi, Lucknow: University of Lucknow, 1953; Devī-māhātmyam = The glorification of the great goddess, Varanasi: All India Kashiraj Trust, 1963.
- Notable awards: 1956 Sahitya Akademi Award in Hindi for the prose commentary Padmavat Sanjivani Vyakhya

Vasudeva Sharan Agrawala, also Vasudeva Saran Agrawala, (1904–1966), was an Indian scholar of cultural history, Sanskrit and Hindi literature, numismatics, museology, and art history. He received the Sahitya Akademi Award in the Hindi language in 1956 for his prose commentary Padmavat Sanjivani Vyakhya. He was a professor in the Department of Art and Architecture at the Benares Hindu University.

== Biography ==
Agrawala was born on 7 August 1904, in a village in Meerut district, United Provinces. He completed high school in Lucknow, took classes in Intermediate (Arts) and B. A. at the Benares Hindu University (BHU), received an M.A. at Lucknow University in 1929; a PhD at Lucknow in 1941; and a D.Lit. at Lucknow in 1946. His PhD and D.Lit. research was published by the University of Lucknow in 1953 under the title, India as known to Pāṇini, work on the application of Pāṇini's work to India's cultural history.

He became the Curator of Mathura museum in 1931, two years after his M.A.; the Director of the U.P. State Museum in Lucknow in 1940; a Superintendent for Museums in the Archaeological Survey of India attached to the Central Asian Antiquities Museum in New Delhi in 1946. In 1951, he moved to BHU as a Professor and Head of the Department of Art and Architecture.

He had 9 children, 8 sons and 1 daughter

== Selected works ==
- Kalā aura saṃskr̥ti, Ilāhābāda : Sāhitya Bhavan Limiṭeḍ, 1952.
- India as known to Panini: A study of the cultural material in Ashtadhyayi, Lucknow: University of Lucknow, 1953
- Padmavat Sanjivani Vyakhya, 1955.
- Devī-māhātmyam = The glorification of the great goddess, Varanasi: All India Kashiraj Trust, 1963.
- The Heritage of Indian Art, New Delhi: Publications Division, Ministry of Information and Broadcasting, 1964.
- Studies in Indian art, Varanasi: Vishwavidyalya Prakashan, 1965.
- Wheel Flag of India Chakra-dhvaja: being a history and exposition of the meaning of the Dharma-chakra and the Sarnath Lion Capital. Varanasi: Prithivi Prakashan. 1964b. OCLC 1129478258.

== Cited works ==
- "AKADEMI AWARDS (1955-2019)". Sahitya Akademi.
- Vatsyayan, Kapila (1994). "Ācārya Vāsudevajī". Prof. Vasudeva Saran Agrawala: a bibliographic survey of his published works (PDF). New Delhi: Indira Gandhi National Centre for the Arts. pp. 7–11.
