= Queen Maya's Dream =

Episode in the traditional story of Buddha's life

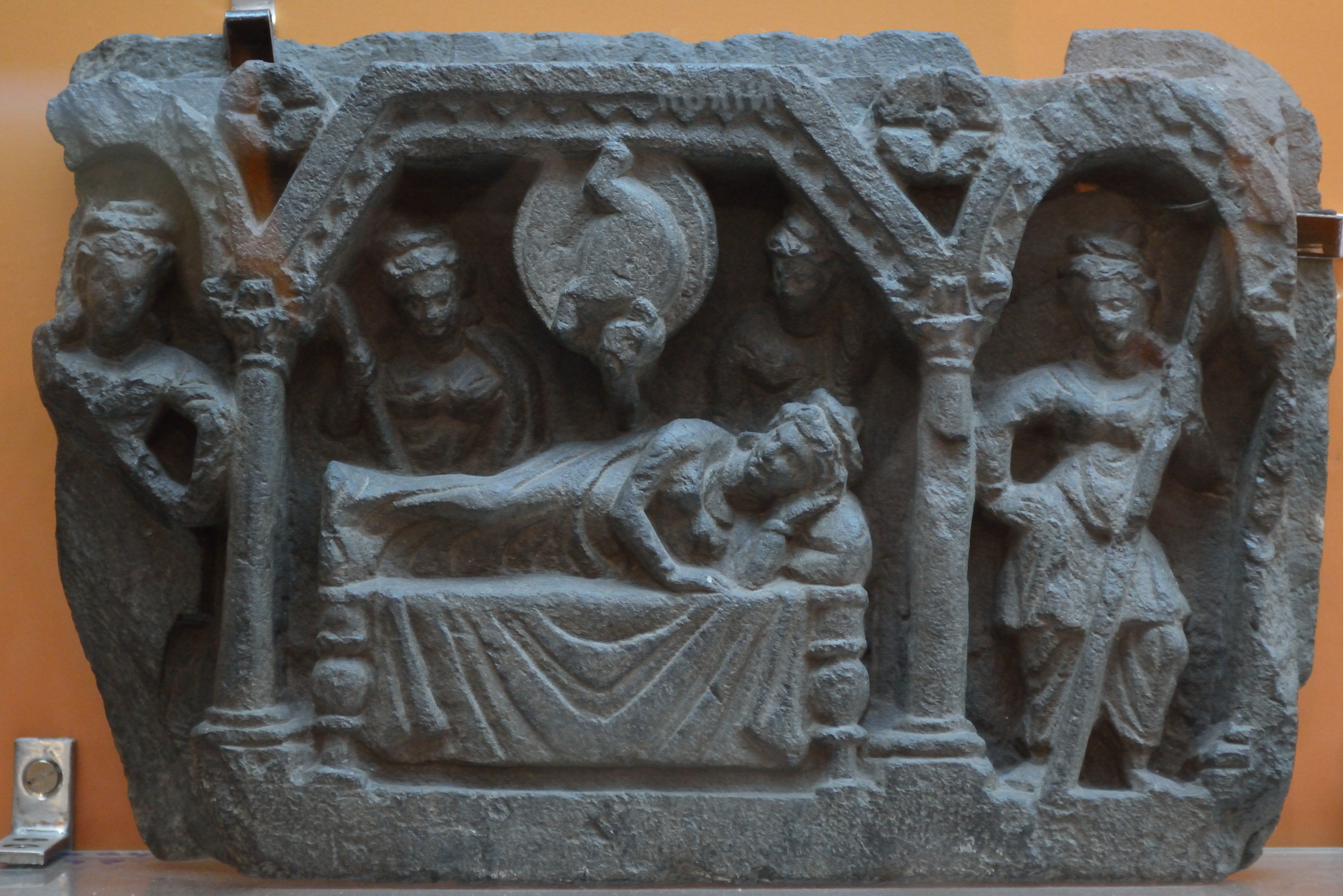
Queen Maya's Dream, c. 2nd century, Gandharan from Mardan

Queen Maya's Dream is an episode in the story of the life of The Buddha, representing his conception by his mother Queen Maya. It is a common scene in the life of Buddha in art, showing Maya asleep on her side, having a dream. Of depictions including Maya, only the birth scene is more common. The incident is seen in several Buddhist sites like Barhut, Sarnath, Amaravati Stupa, Nagarjunakonda, Ajanta, other Gandharan sites, and sites in Central, South-East and East Asia. It is the first scene in the sequence of images telling the story of the birth of the Buddha.

== Legend ==
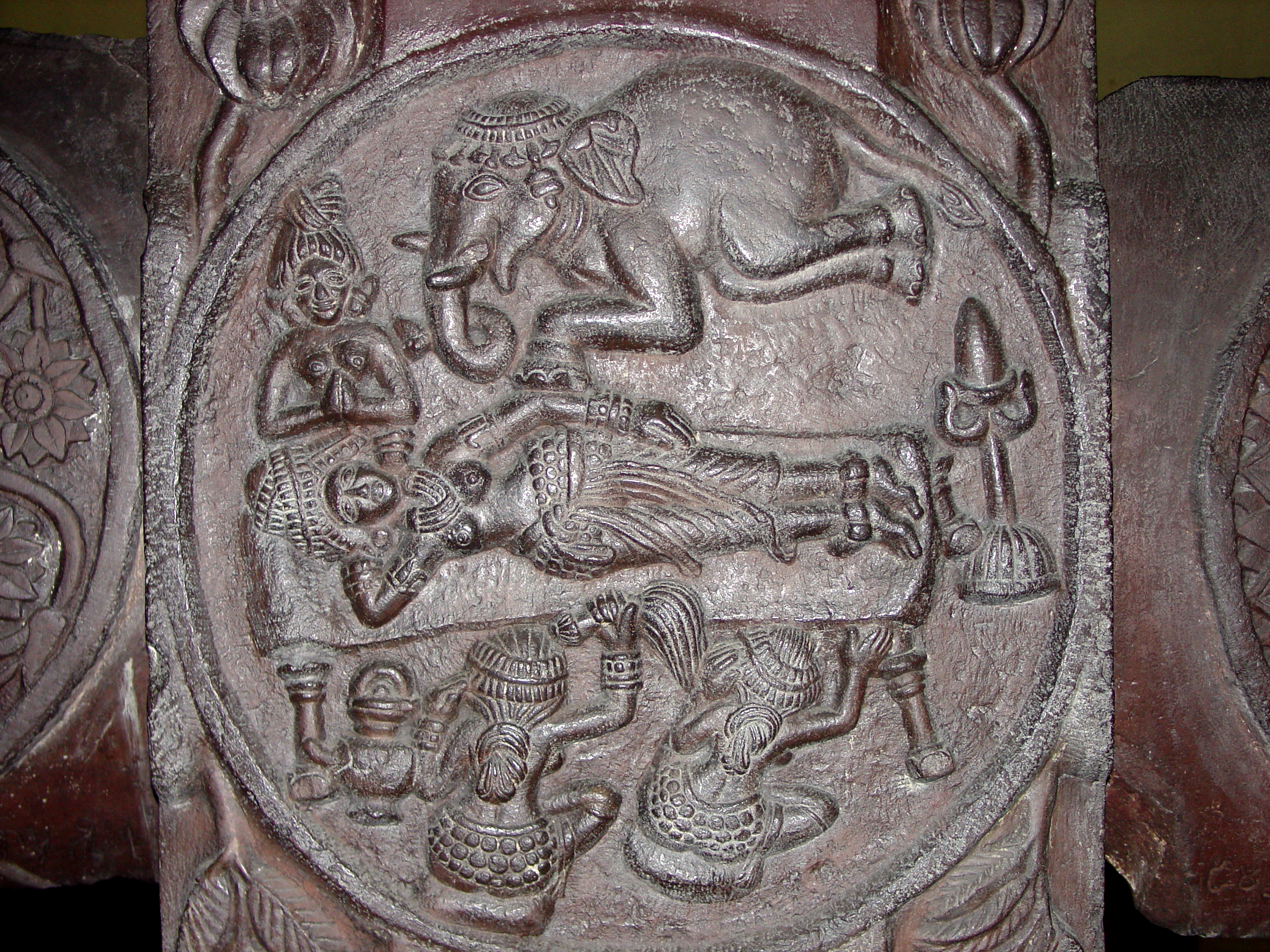
Bharhut, c. 100 BC

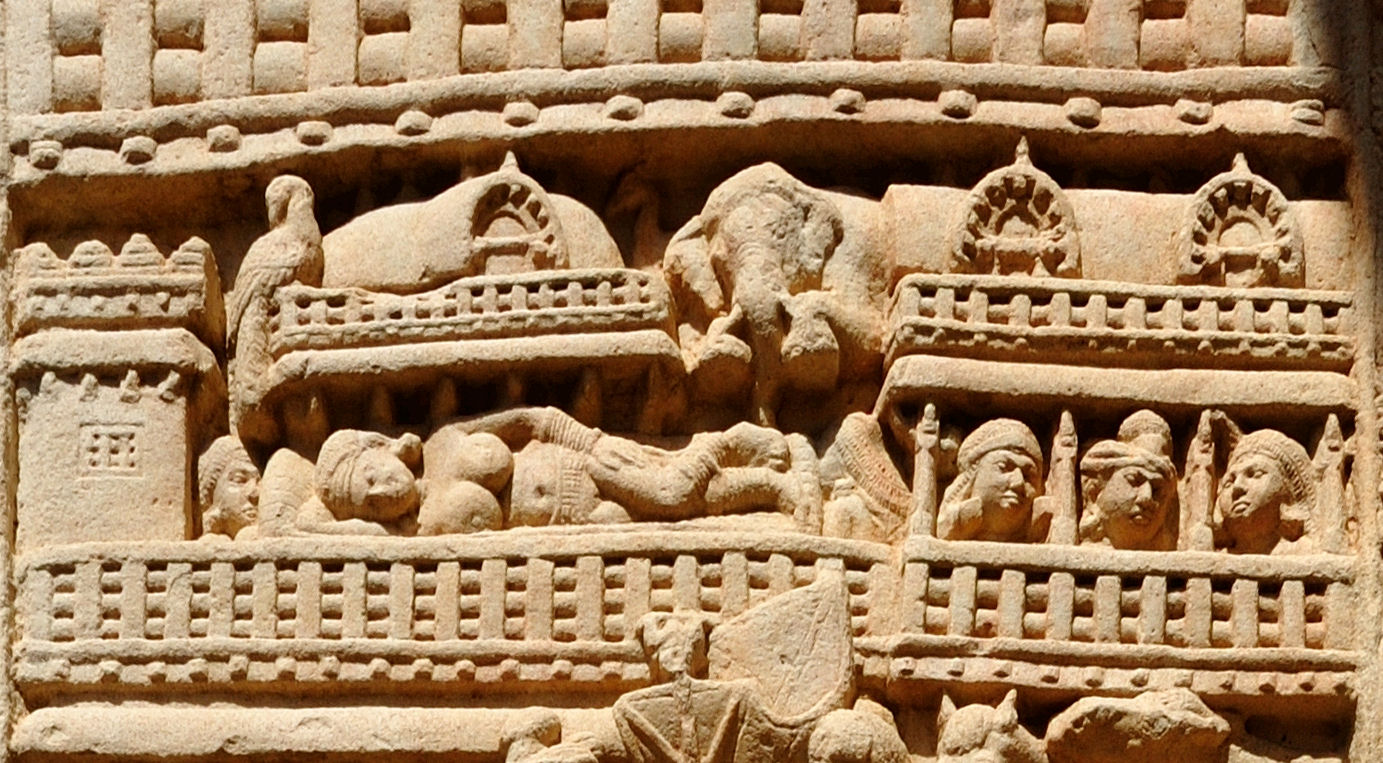
Queen Maya's Dream, Sanchi Stupa

The story of the dream is recorded in several historic texts like Lalitavistara, the Abiniskramana sutra, the Buddhacarita, the Mahavastu and the Mülasarvastivada Vinaya.

One of the texts says, "A summer festival was organised in the city of Kapilasvastu for seven days before the full moon, Mahämayä had taken part in the festivities On the seventh day she woke-up early, bathed in scented water, and distributed alms, wore splendid clothes and ate pure food followed by performing the vows of the holy day. After the ritual, she went to her bed chamber, fell asleep, and saw the following dream." The four guardians of the world lifted her on her couch and carried her to the Himalaya mountains and placed her under a great sal tree .... Then their queens bathed her ... dressed her in heavenly garments, anointed her with perfumes and put garlands of heavenly flowers on her. ... They laid her on a heavenly couch, with its head towards the east. The Bodhisattva, wandering as a superb white elephant ... approached her from the north. Holding a white lotus flower in his trunk, he circumambulated her three times. Then he gently struck her right side, and entered her womb." (Dakkhillapassam tlewa kucchim pauitthasadiso)

After waking up, Maya described her dream to her husband, Suddhodana, who sent for a learned priest to interpret the dream. The priest predicted that the queen would be impregnated with a son, and the son would either rule the world or renounce worldly pleasures and live a religious life and would become a Buddha.

== Iconography ==
Depiction of the scene of conception of Buddha is an example of auspicious female sexuality. The scene shows Queen Maya lying on the couch on her side with female attendants, sleeping on the side and four lokapalas or celestial beings are standing in the corner, an elephant is seen entering the womb of Maya.
