= Lahore Museum =

Art museum in Lahore, Pakistan

- عجائب گھر لاہور

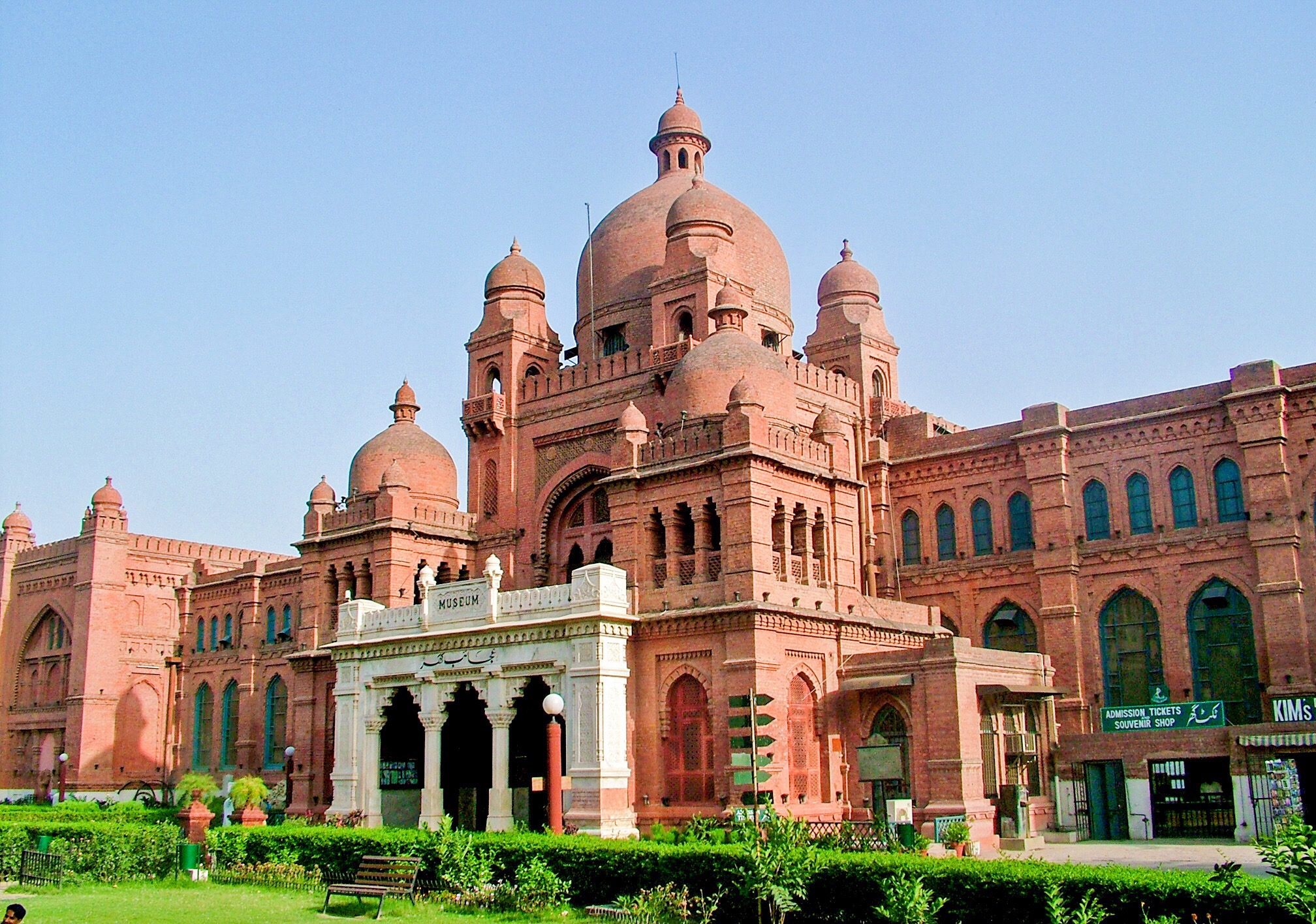
- Entrance to the museum
- Established: 1865, moved to present site in 1894
- Location: The Mall, Lahore, Punjab, Pakistan
- Coordinates: 31.568226°N 74.308174°E
- Type: Archaeology, art, heritage, modern history, religious
- Collection size: 60,000
- Website: lahoremuseum.punjab.gov.pk

The Lahore Museum (Urdu: عجائب گھر لاہور, romanized: ajayb ghar lahour; lit. 'Lahore Wonder House') is a museum located in Lahore, Punjab, Pakistan. It is one of the oldest and most significant museums in the country, being founded in 1865. It was moved to its present building in 1894 on The Mall during the British colonial period. Lahore Museum is Pakistan's largest museum, as well as one of its most visited ones.

The museum, built in a Indo-Saracenic style, houses an extensive collection of Buddhist art from the ancient Indo-Greek and Gandhara kingdoms. It also has collections from the Indus Valley Civilisation, Mughal Empire, Sikh Empire and the British Raj.

== History ==
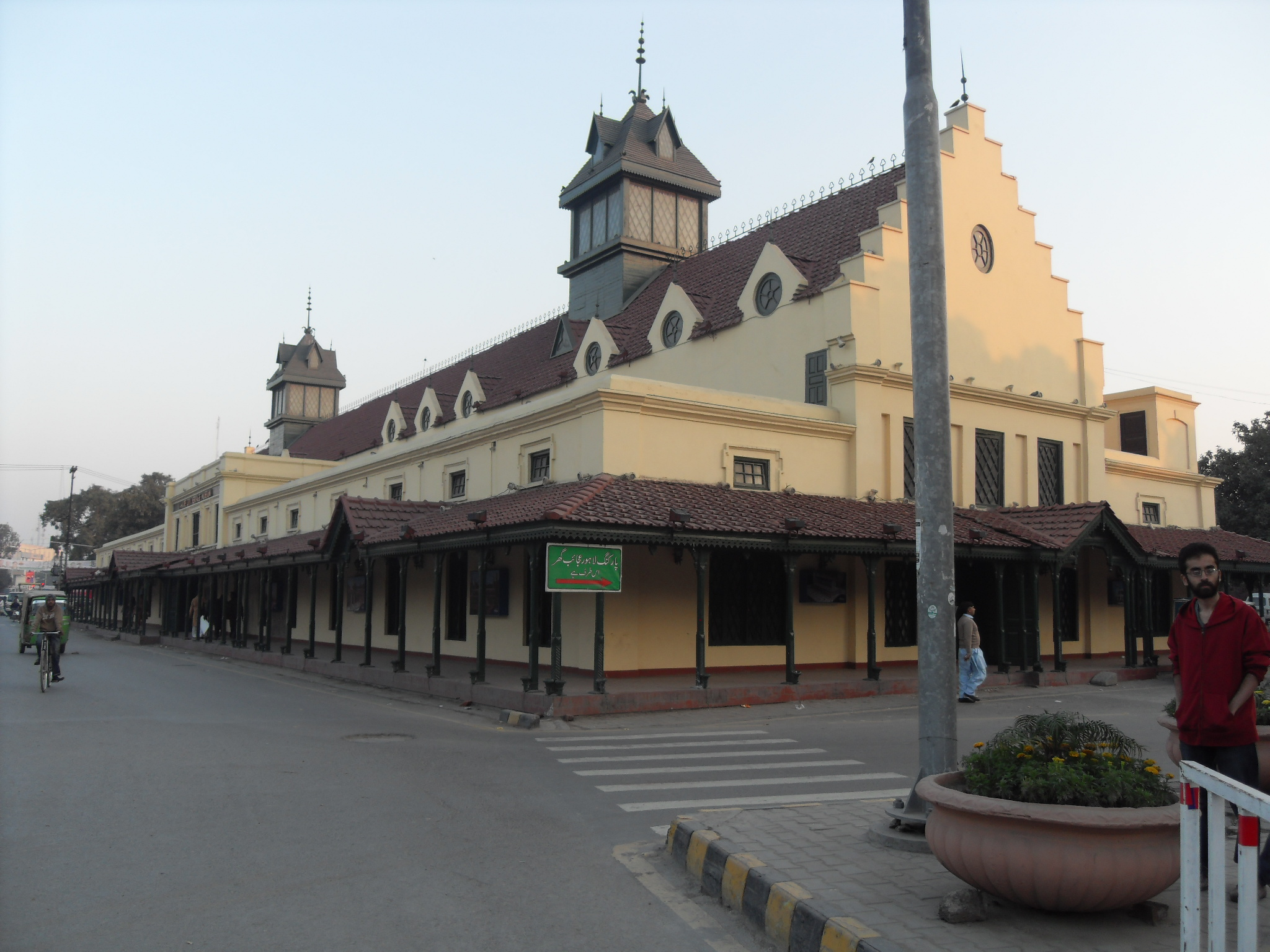
The Tollinton Market building was the initial site where the museum's collection was displayed.

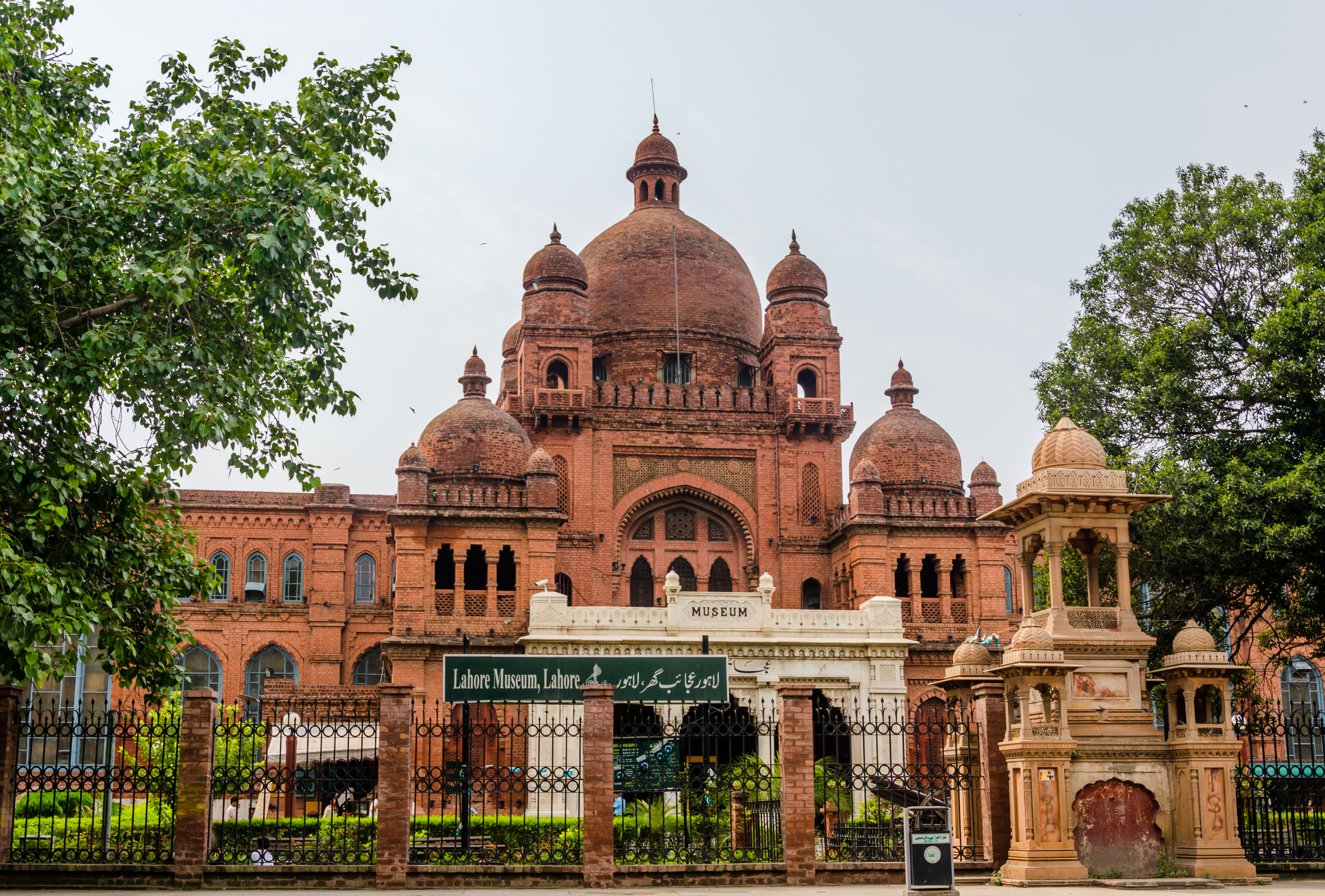
The current museum building was designed in the syncretic Indo-Saracenic architectural style

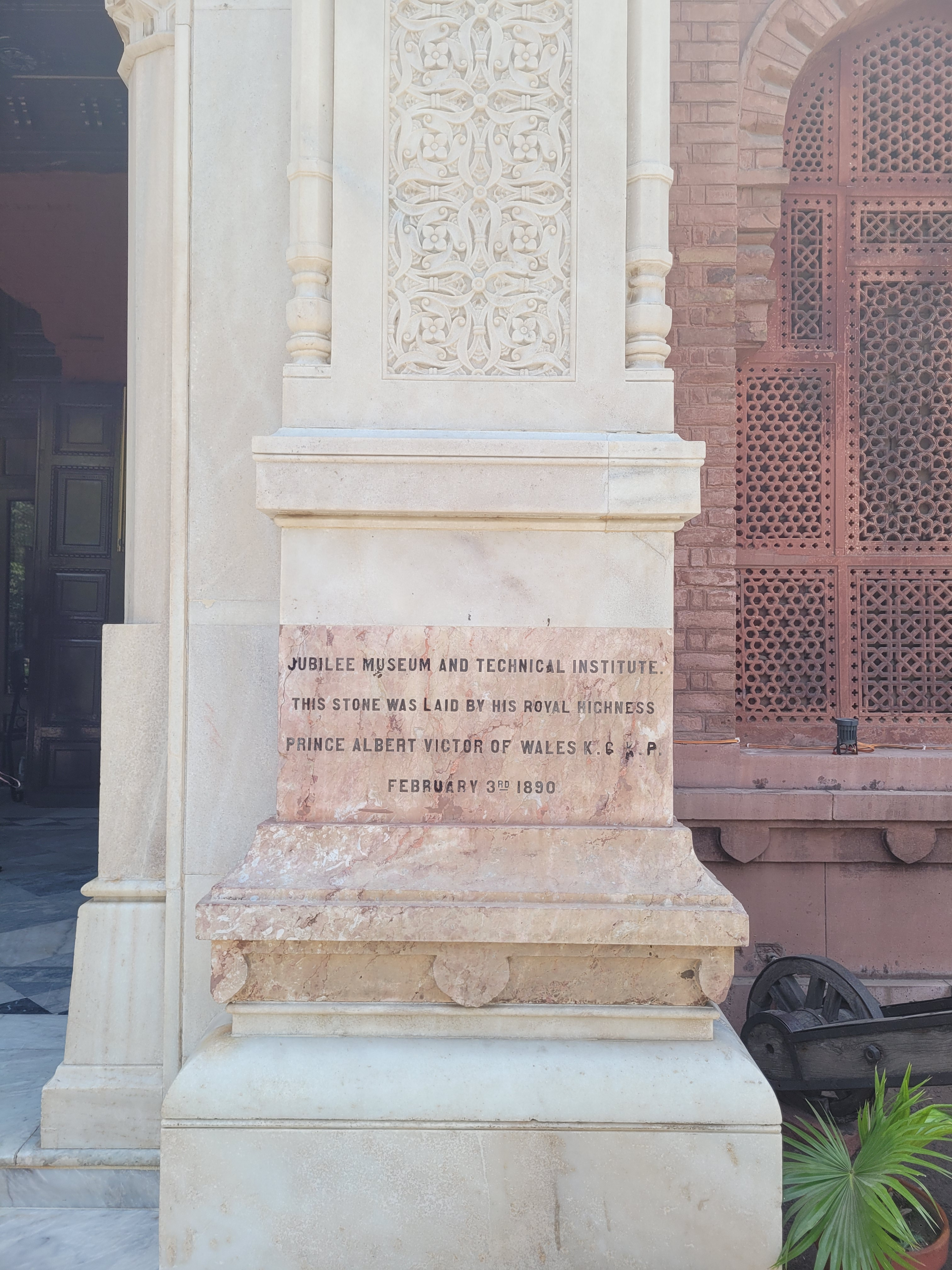
The Lahore Museum cornerstone for existing building, laid 3 February 1890 by Prince Albert Victor, is embedded in the pillar at the Museum entrance

Lahore Museum was originally established in 1865–66 on the site of the current Tollinton Market – a hall built for the 1864 Punjab Exhibition. The Tollinton Market building has since been handed over to the National College of Arts (NCA), which uses the space as an extended block for art exhibitions and cultural displays. The present building was designed by Bhai Ram Singh and John Lockwood Kipling, while its construction was overseen by Ganga Ram.

It was constructed as a memorial of Golden Jubilee of Queen Victoria held in 1887, and financed through a special public fund raised on the occasion. The foundation stone of the new museum was laid on 3 February 1890 by Prince Albert Victor, Duke of Clarence, Queen Victoria's grandson. On its completion in 1894, the entire museum collection was transferred to present building with its new name as Jubilee Museum.

The Lahore Museum, with the Zamzama Gun placed directly in front of the building, is the setting of the opening scene in the novel Kim by Rudyard Kipling, whose father, John Lockwood Kipling, was one of the museum's earliest curators. John Lockwood Kipling was succeeded by K. N. Sitaram. The museum's collection was shifted in 1894 to its present location on The Mall, in Lahore's colonial-era core.

In 1948, in the aftermath of the partition of Punjab, the artefacts of the museum were divided between the newly formed countries of Pakistan and India, with the museum retaining about 60% of its collection. The rest was given to India and eventually housed at the Government Museum and Art Gallery in Chandigarh, built specifically for this purpose.

The museum's golden years are considered to be from 1970 to 1990, when scholar, archaeologist, and museologist Dr Saif-ur-Rehman Dar served as its director. He wrote several books about the museum, and his tenure was complemented by that of B.A. Qureshi, who was the chairman of the museum's board of governors back then.

Over 250,000 visitors were registered at the Lahore Museum in 2005. This dropped to 236,536 in 2016, 214,697 in 2017, but rose to 227,994 in 2018. It was the most popular museum of Pakistan among foreigners in 2016 (2,956 visits) and 2017 (2,941 visits). It dropped to second place (with 3,659 foreign visitors) in 2018, having been replaced by Taxila Museum.

== Scope ==
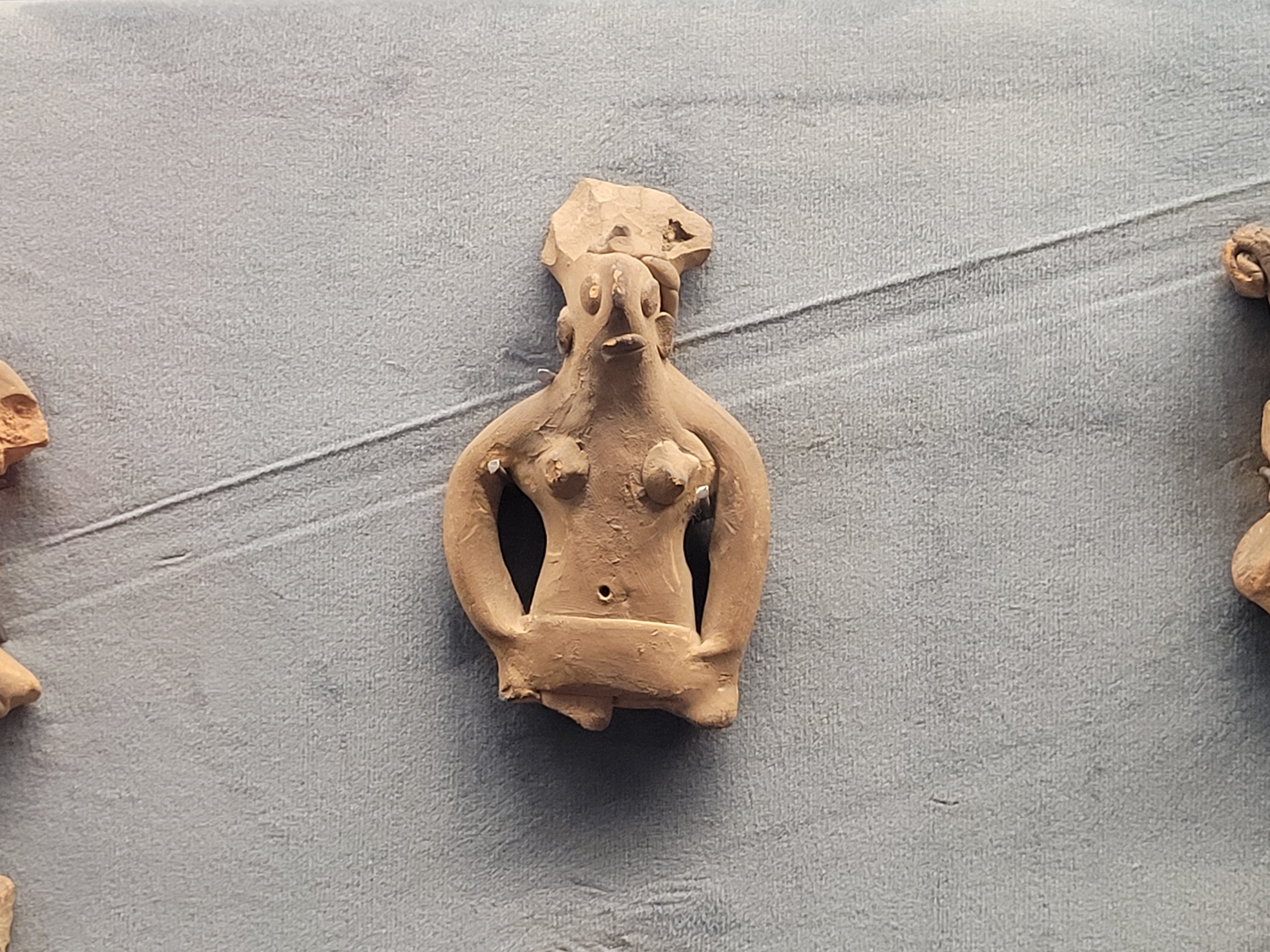
Indus Valley Civilisation collection - terracotta female figurine

The museum displays archaeological materials from Bronze Age (Indus Valley Civilisation) to the medieval-era Hindu Shahi and Mughal period. It has one of the largest collections of archaeology, history, arts, fine arts, applied arts, ethnology, and craft objects in Pakistan. It also has an extensive collection of Hellenistic and Mughal coins. There is also a photo gallery dedicated to the emergence of Pakistan as an independent state, the Pakistan Movement Gallery.

== Collections ==
The museum has a number of Greco-Buddhist sculptures as well as Mughal and Pahari paintings on display. Over 58,000 artifacts are reported to be part of its collection, with only 14,000 being on display. The collection contains important relics from the Indus Valley civilization, Gandhara, and Graeco-Bactrian periods as well. The Fasting Buddha from Gandhara, dating from the Gandhara period, is one of the museums most prized and celebrated objects.

=== The Evolution of Mankind ===
The ceiling of the entrance hall features The Evolution of Mankind, a large mural consisting of 48 panels (each measuring 1.8 by 2.4 metres). It was painted by Pakistani artist Sadequain who originally completed it in 1973. Due to the weather conditions and termite attacks, the mural suffered significant damage over the years. A grant was approved by the Governor of Punjab in 2008 to start the restoration work. It was taken down in 2010, while restoration work began in 2012. By 2018, 16 of the panels had been restored by Uzma Usmani and Mumtaz Hussain.

The museum also contains fine specimens of Mughal and Sikh carved woodwork and has a large collection of paintings dating back to the British period. The collection also includes musical instruments, ancient jewelry, textiles, pottery, and armory, as well as some Tibetan and Nepalese work on display.

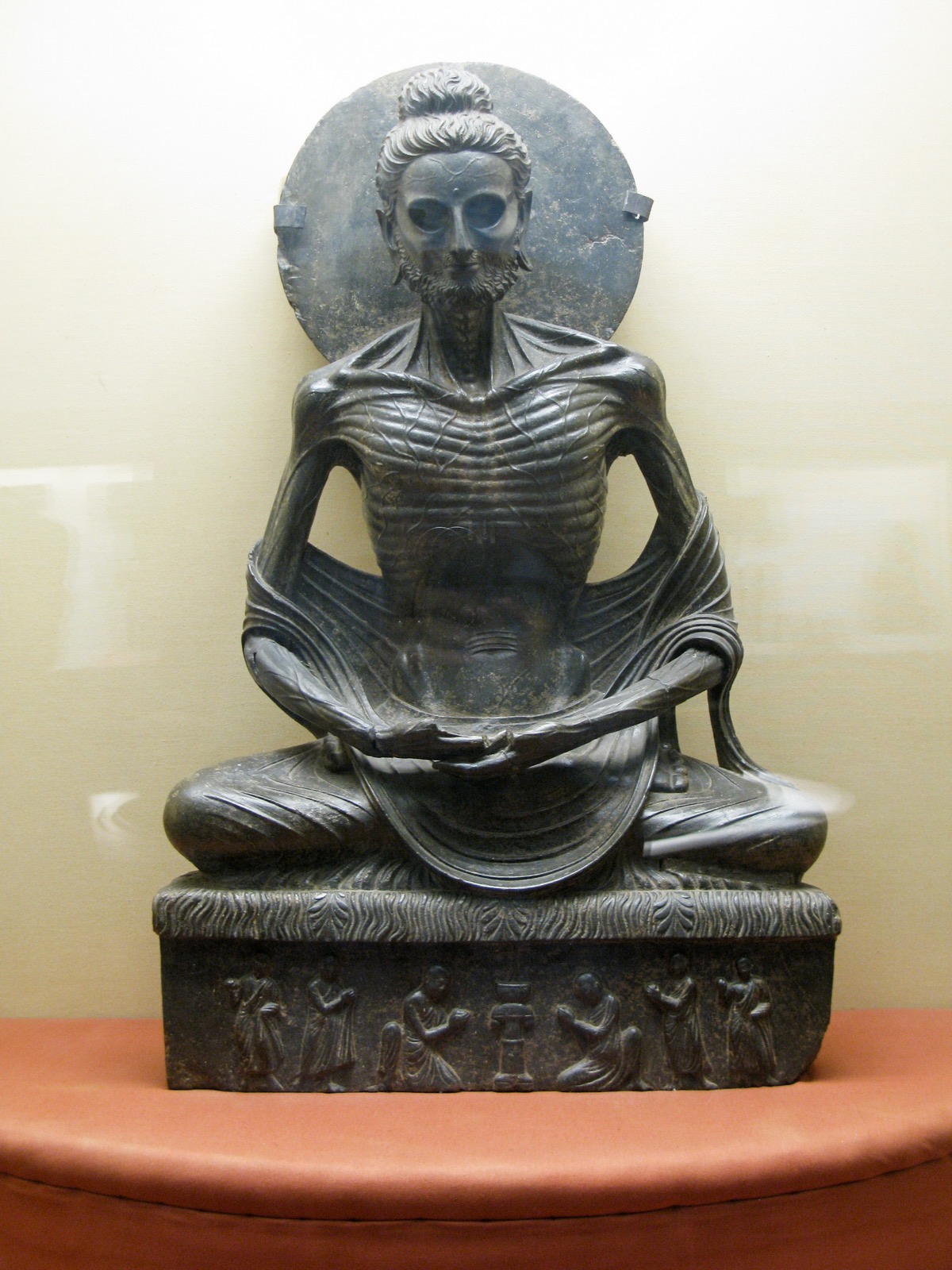
The Gandharan sculpture of Fasting Buddha from Gandhara

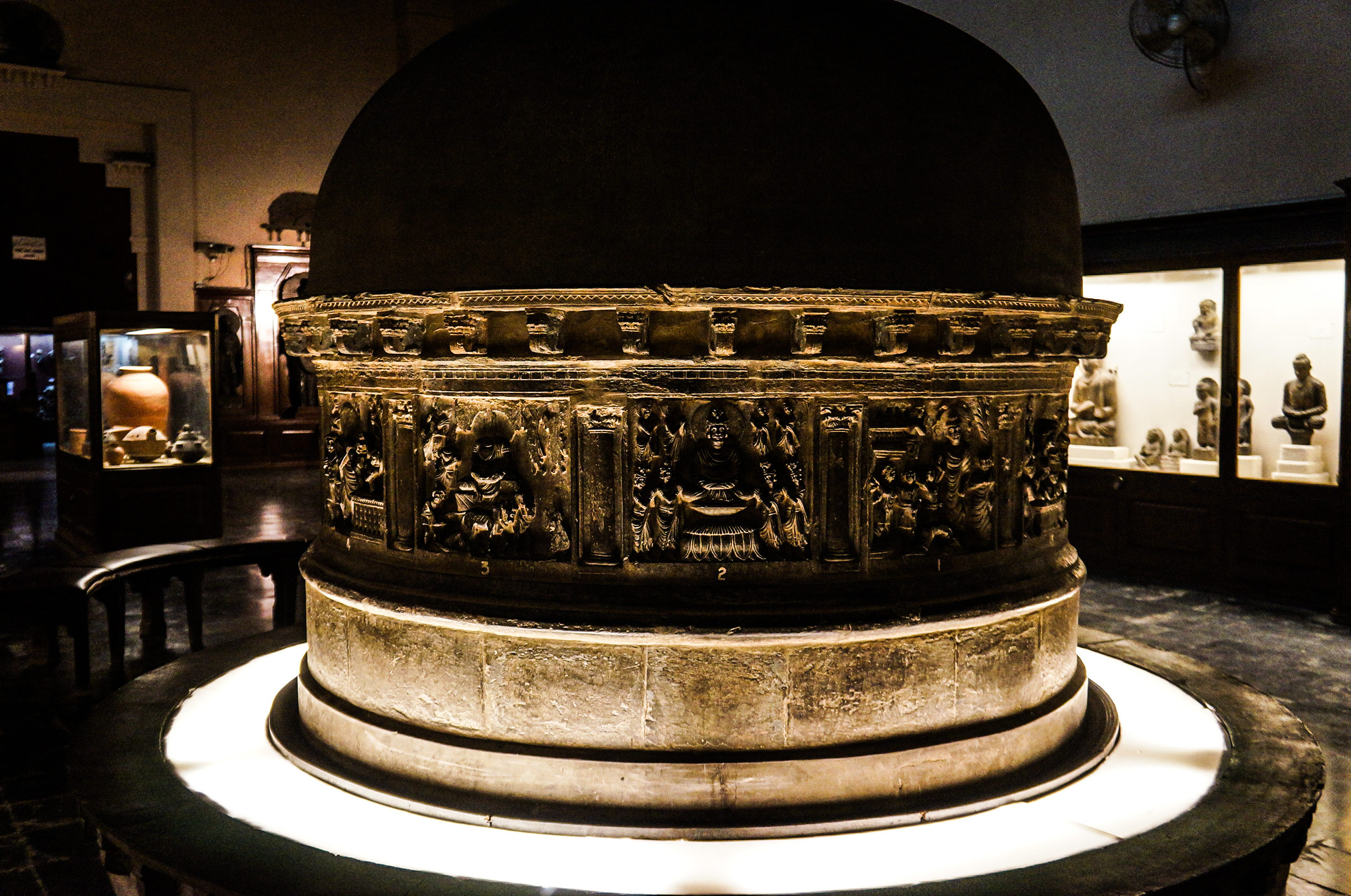
A Gandharan-era miniature stupa

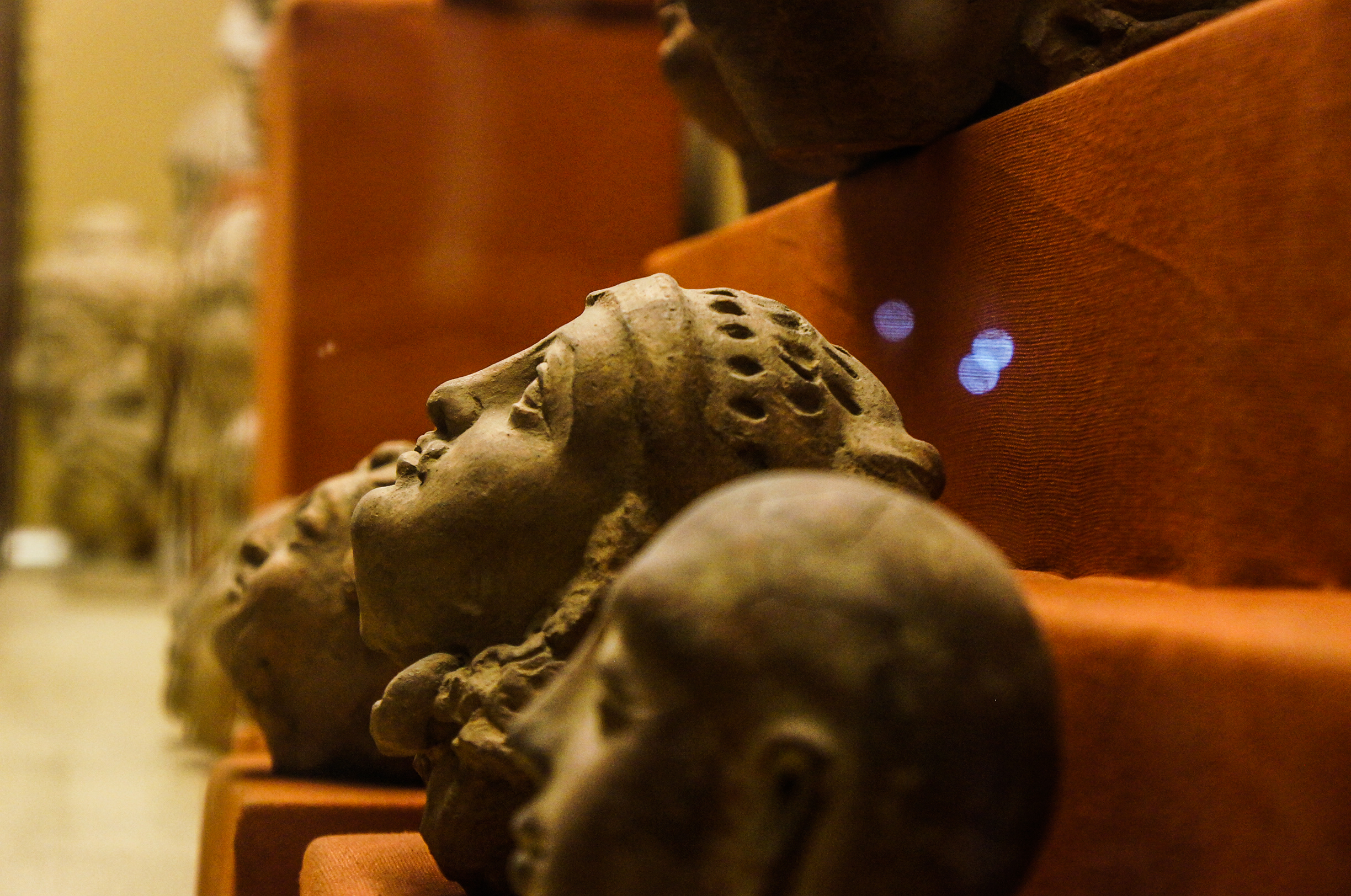
Relics from the Indo-Greek era

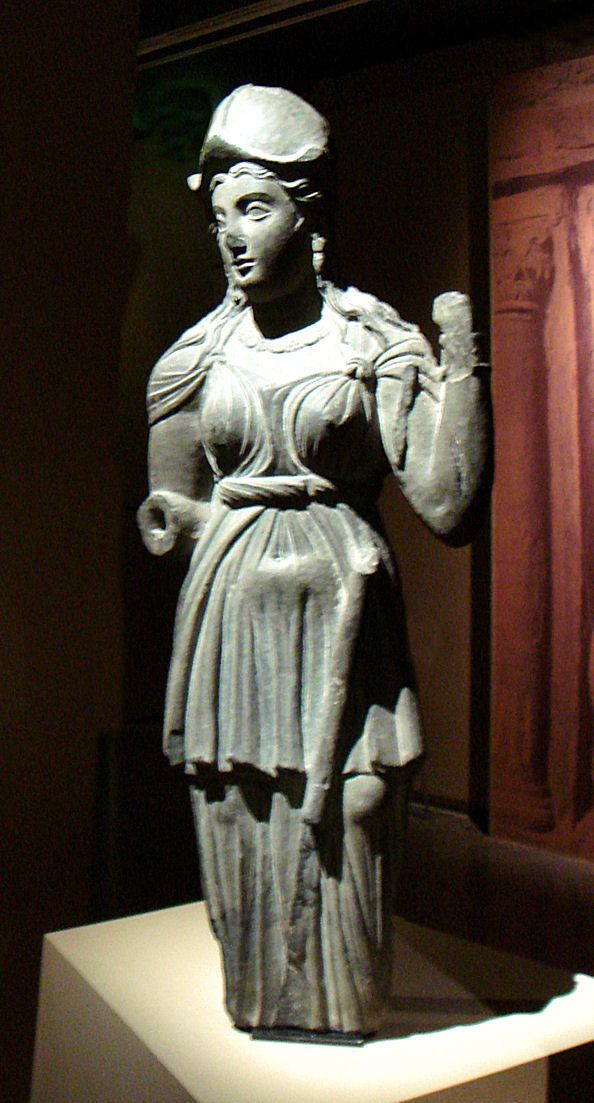
Gandharan Athena

== Directors ==
The following is a list of the museum's directors and curators.

| No. | Name | Role | Tenure |
|---|---|---|---|
| 1 | Captain I.P Westmorland | Curator | 1873 – 1874 |
| 2 | A.R Becher Esquire | Curator | 1874 – 1875 |
| 3 | John Lockwood Kipling | Curator | 1875 – 1877, 1879 – 1890 |
| 4 | D. Gabbick | Curator | 1877 – 1879 |
| 5 | Fred. Henry Andrews | Curator | 1890 – 1893, 1893 – 1897 |
| 6 | Bhai Ram Singh | Curator | 1897 – 1898, 1906 – 1909, 1908 – 1909 |
| 7 | Percy Brown | Curator | 1898 – 1906, 1907 – 1908 |
| 8 | G.A Wathen | Curator | 1909 – 1912 |
| 9 | Hugh Lionel Heath | Curator | 1912 – 1929, 1925 – 1926, 1927 – 1928 |
| 10 | K.N Sita Ram | Curator | 1928 – 1940 |
| 11 | Rai Bahadur S.N. Gupta | Curator | 1920 – 1925, 1926 – 1927, 1940 – 1942 |
| 12 | K.B Molvi Zafar Hasan | Curator | 1942 – 1943 |
| 13 | Malik Shams | Curator | 1947 – 1965 |
| 14 | Syed Muhammad Taqi | Curator / Director | 07-06-1965 to 22–05–1974 |
| 15 | Dr. Saifur Rehman Dar | Director | 07-08-1974 to 15–08–1993, 01-08-1995 to 16–04–1998 |
| 16 | Dr. F.M. Anjum Rehmani | Officiating Director | 16-08-1993 to 31–07–1995, 17-04-1998 to 23–07–2001 |
| 17 | Mansoor Sohail | Director (Additional Charge) | 23-07-2000 to 29–11–2001 |
| 18 | Dr. Liaquat Ali Khan Niazi | Director | 30-11-2001 to 16–04–2004 |
| 19 | Syed Gulzar Mashhadi | Director | 23-04-2004 to 30–06–2005 |
| 20 | Naheed Rizvi | Director | 01-07-2005 to 29–08–2008 |
| 21 | Dr. Asghar Nadeem Syed | Director | 17-09-2008 to 13–05–2009 |
| 22 | Dr. Kamran Afzal Cheema | Director | 09-07-2009 to 12–08–2009 |
| 23 | Muhammad Siddique Sheikh | Director | 12-08-2009 to 20–04–2010 |
| 24 | Salman Ijaz | Director | 21-04-2010 to 18–05–2010 |
| 25 | Humera Alam | Director | 19-05-2010 to 16–11–2012 |
| 26 | Sumaira Samad | Director | 21-11-2012 to 08–06–2016 |
| 27 | Syed Tahir Raza Hamdani | Director (Additional Charge) | 14-06-2016 to 23–07–2016 |
| 28 | Humayun Mazhar Sheikh | Director | 25-07-2016 to 02–07–2018 |
| 29 | Saman Rai | Director (Additional Charge) | 07-11-2018 to 19–03–2019 |
| 30 | Nasir Jamal Hotiana | Director | 20-03-2019 to 31–08–2019 |
| 31 | Tariq Mahmood Javaid | Director | 02-09-2019 to 23–09–2020 |
| 32 | Ijaz Ahmed Minhas | Director | 23-11-2020 to 07–10–2022 |
| 33 | Muhammad Usman | Director | 17-11-2022 to 24–11–2023 |
| 34 | Sadaf Zafar | Director (Additional Charge) | 08-01-2024 to 15–01–2024 |
| 35 | Sadia Tehreem | Director | 16-01-2024 to 01–05–2024 |
| 36 | Nabila Irfan | Director | 01-05-2024 to 14–10–2025 |
| 37 | Capt. (Retd.) Tahir Zafar Abbasi | Director | 24-10-2025 to 25–11–2025 |
| 38 | Taseer Ahmad | Director | 26-11-2025 to date |

== Book ==
The book Masterpieces of Lahore Museum, written by Anjum Rehmani, was published by the museum in 1999 with financial assistance from UNESCO. A new edition was published in 2006.

== In popular culture ==
- The opening of Rudyard Kipling's novel, Kim (published in 1901), is set in the vicinity of the old/original Lahore Museum and the Mall areas.

== See also ==
- List of museums in Pakistan
- Lahore: History and Architecture of Mughal Monuments
