= Chamba House, Lahore =

Coordinates: 31.5496°N 74.3367°E

Chamba House
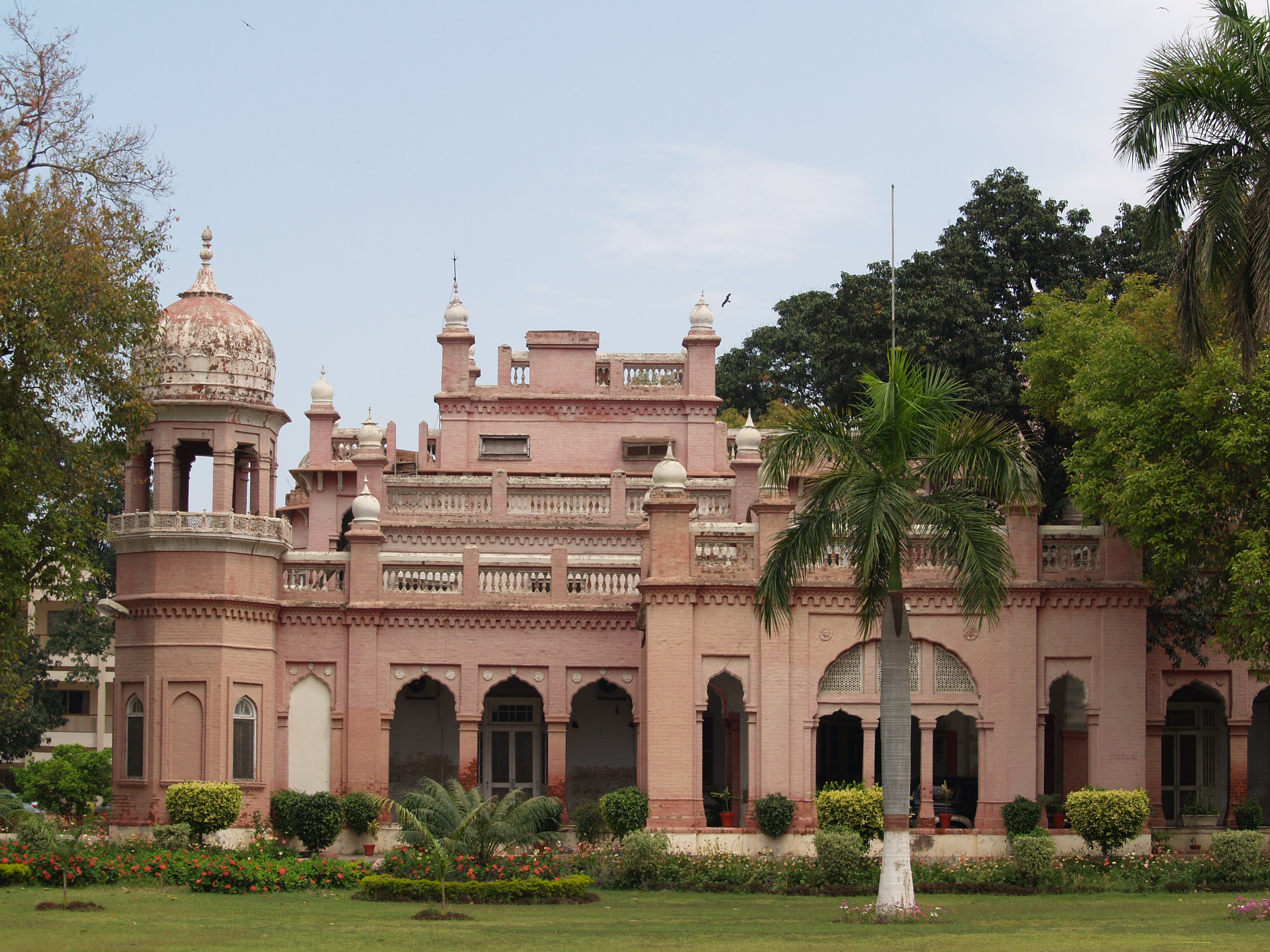
- Frontal façade of Chamba House

General information
- Location: Lahore, Pakistan

Design and construction
- Architect(s): Bhai Ram Singh

Chamba House is a historic building in Lahore, Punjab which formerly served as a residence of the Raja of Chamba.

== History ==
Chamba was one of the oldest princely state in India, and its ruler, the Raja, was entitled to an 11-gun salute. One of its Rajas, Bhuri Singh, had commissioned the Chamba House for his residence in Lahore. It was designed by Bhai Ram Singh.

It was built in an area of Lahore that had once hosted encampments during the 1880 durbar. The area was later renamed Government Officers' Residences (G.O.R.). Following the partition of India, Lakshman Sen acceded his state to the Dominion of India. This property of his, however, came under the control of the Government of Pakistan, which later converted it into a guest house. It is maintained by Pakistan Public Works Department.

== See also ==
- Chamba State
- Faridkot House, Lahore
