= Faridkot House =

Royal residence in Delhi, India

Coordinates: 28.618738°N 77.230577°E

Faridkot House is the former residence of the Maharaja of Faridkot in Delhi. It is located on Copernicus Marg, next to Baroda House. The palace is constructed in the art deco style. In a court battle that took over 20 years, the daughters of Maharaja Sir Harinder Singh won the will and received Rs. 200 billion (US$4.4 billion), which includes Faridkot House. The palace exemplifies late‑1930s Art Deco, featuring a central stepped tower flanked by symmetrical wings and a projecting entrance porch. Horizontal banding on the tower evokes "speed lines", while metal railings resembling ship decks and stylized vent grilles emphasize the Streamline Moderne variant of Deco.

There was also a Faridkot House in Lahore (now in Pakistan).

== History ==
The Faridkot House was commissioned by Maharaja Harinder Singh Brar and completed in 1939. The design is attributed to Austro–Hungarian architect Karl Molt von Heinz, with Sir Sobha Singh as contractor. After Indian independence, it accommodated the Canadian High Commission, then the National Human Rights Commission, before being designated as the National Green Tribunal’s principal office in 2010. In a protracted inheritance dispute that concluded in 2020, the Maharaja’s daughters secured legal ownership of the property as part of a larger ₹20,000 crore estate settlement.

== Significance ==
Faridkot House is one of several princely‑state residences built in New Delhi following the 1911 Imperial Durbar, alongside Baroda House, Jaipur House and others. These palaces symbolized the relationship between British India and the subordinate princely states and remain fine examples of eclectic and modernist architecture in the capital’s Lutyens' Delhi precinct.
