= Sikri Stupa =

Ancient Buddhist stupa

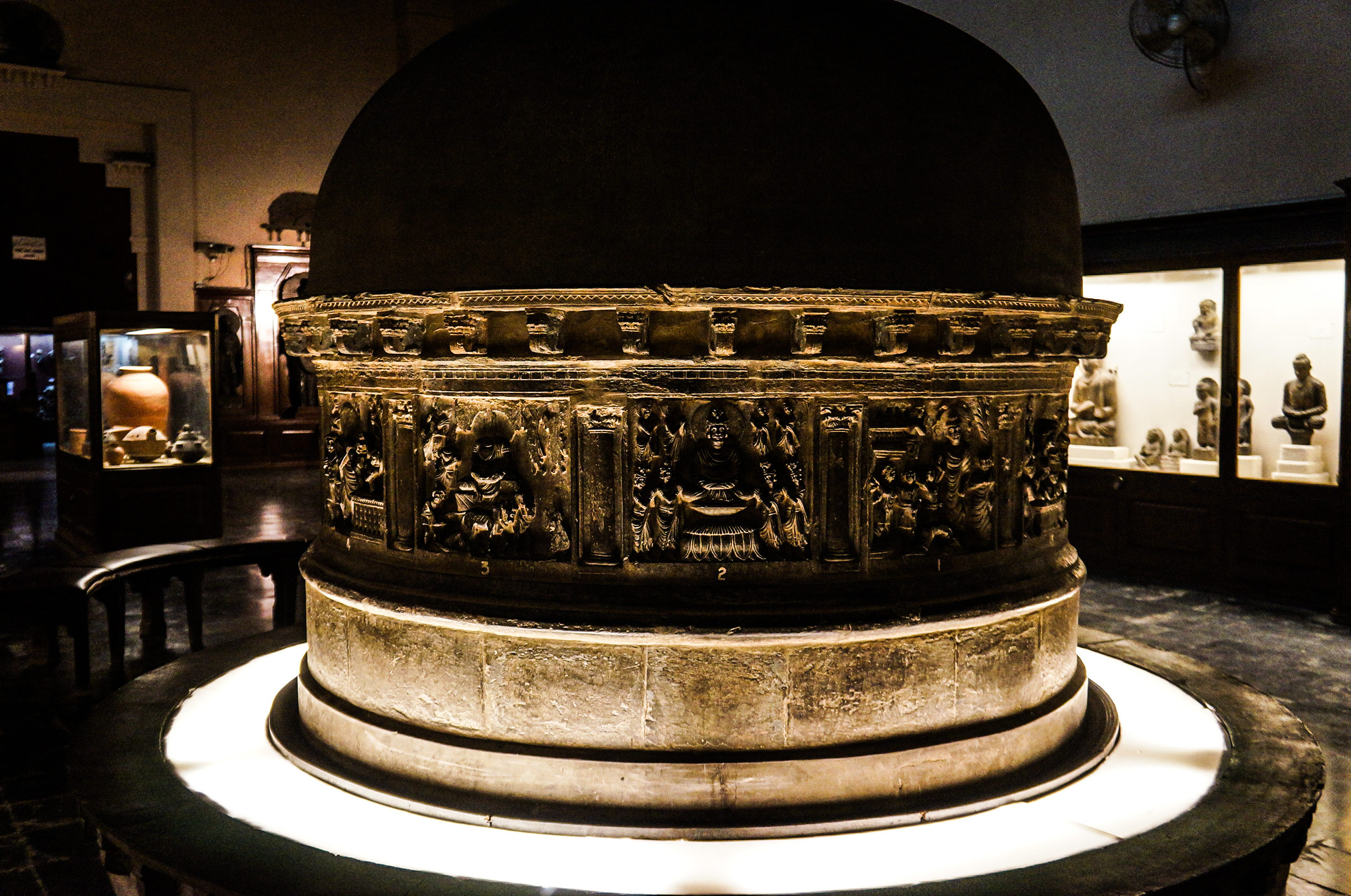
Sikri stupa inside the Lahore Museum

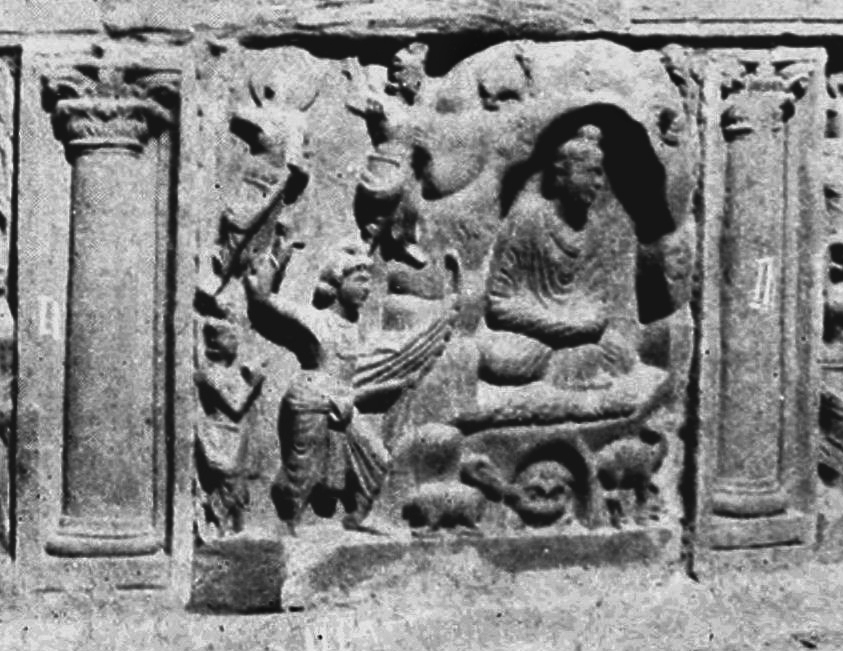
Panel from the Sikri stupa showing the visit of Indra and his harpist to the Buddha in Indrasala Cave.

The Sikri stupa is a work of Buddhist art dated to 3rd-4th century from the Kushan period in Gandahara, consisting of 13 narrative panels with events from the life of Buddha. Modern restoration accounts for their order in the Lahore Museum. The restoration began while Harold Arthur Deane was still assigned to the North-West Frontier Province in what was then British India (today part of Pakistan). Three photos taken around 1890 show the order of the panels in the earliest restoration.

Gotama Buddha is shown sitting on a grass mat. No grass mat is shown for the representation of Buddha in the Trayastrimsa heaven. One panels depicts the Dipankara Jataka—the Jataka are stories of Buddha's incarnations before he was reborn as Siddhartha Gautama. In the panel, Sumedha is shown in four forms appearing before the Dīpankara Buddha. First Sumedha bargains with a flower seller. He throws the lotus flowers in the air before prostrating himself before the Buddha. The final form shows Sumeda suspended in the air like one of the lotus flowers. This narrative mimics closely the legend of the Dipankara Jataka..
