= Bhai Ram Singh =

Architect from Punjab

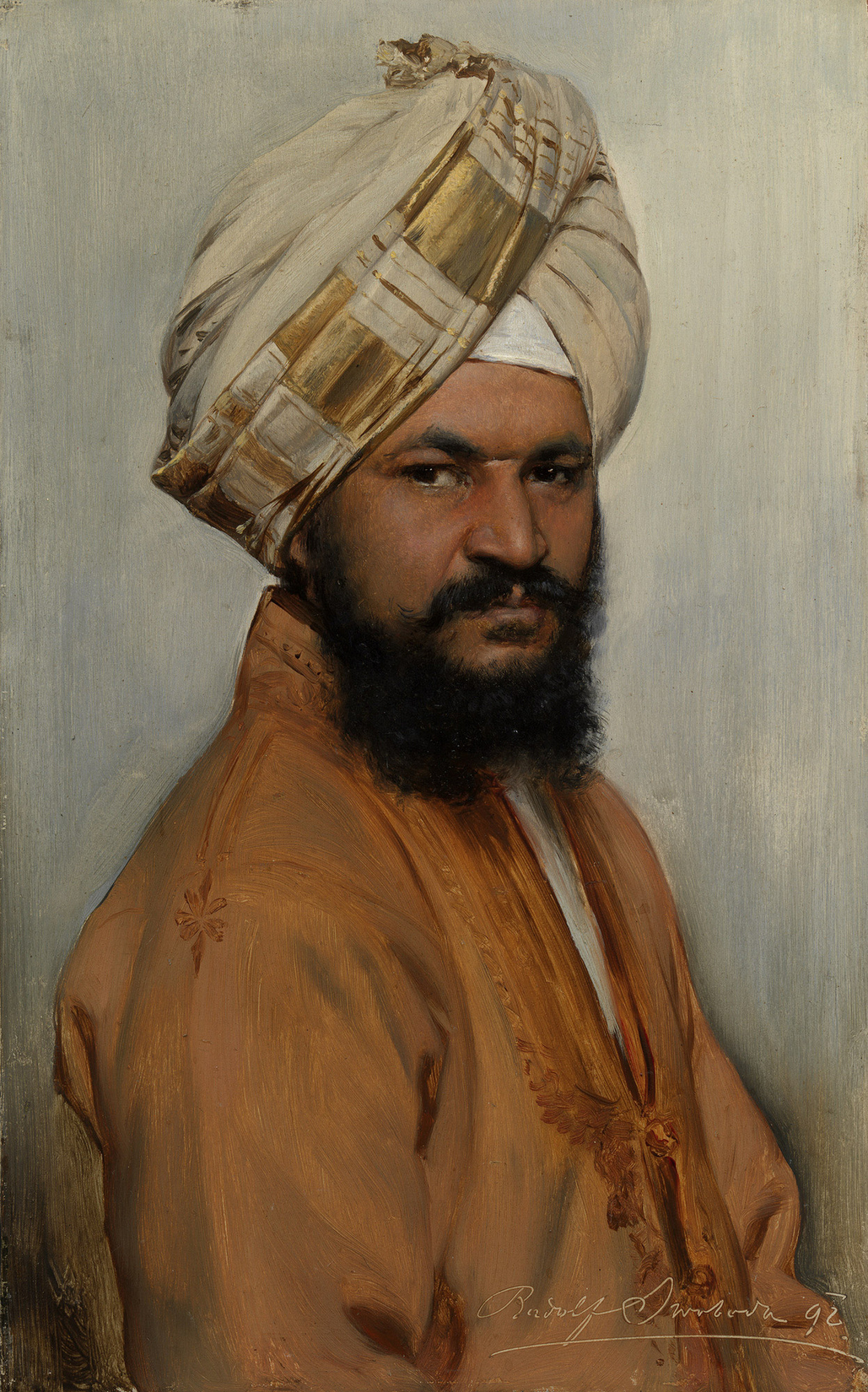
- Bhai Ram Singh by Rudolf Swoboda, 1892, Osborne House
- Born: 1857; Rasulpur, Punjab, British India
- Died: 1916 (aged 58–59); Lahore, Punjab, British India
- Education: Mayo School of Industrial Arts
- Occupation: Architect
- Buildings: Aitchison College; Lahore Museum; University of the Punjab

Bhai Ram Singh MVO (1858–1916) was one of pre-partition Punjab's foremost architects, dominating the scene for nearly two decades from the 1890s. Amongst his works is the Durbar Room, Osborne House, on the Isle of Wight, England; Lahore Museum and Governor's House in Simla.

Amongst Bhai Ram Singh's most famous works are: the Lahore Museum, the Mayo School of Arts, Aitchison College, Chamba House and Punjab University, all in Lahore, and Islamia College, Peshawar. In Simla, the Governor’s House and in Lyallpur (now Faisalabad), the College of Agriculture. He also worked with John Lockwood Kipling to design the Durbar room in Osborne House, Queen Victoria's summer home on the Isle of Wight. He designed Khalsa College, Amritsar.

Most of his work fits under the style of Indo-Saracenic architecture, of which he was the most significant Indian architect. Many of his commissions were built by the leading contractor Sir Ganga Ram, and also involved Lockwood Kipling, father of Rudyard Kipling, to some extent Singh's mentor. The precise contributions of these can be hard to estimate; Ram was mainly an engineer and contractor, but is sometimes given credit as the architect of his buildings.

== Biography ==
Singh came from Ramgarhia Sikh family of Rasulpur, near Batala, Punjab, British India, and showed early talent. He is supposed to have repaired the piano of the Deputy Commissioner of Amritsar when he was 13, despite being unfamiliar with the instrument. He became a student at the Mayo School of Arts (now Mayo School of Industrial Arts, in Lahore, founded in 1875, and became a protege of the principal Lockwood Kipling, father of Rudyard Kipling. He became assistant drawing master at the school, and eventually, its principal from 1903 to 1913, as well as designing its building.

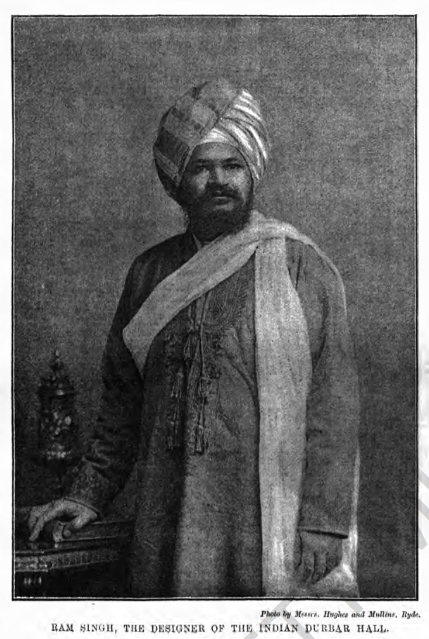

In 1885-7 he worked with Kipling, decorating the "Indian Passage" and ballroom at Bagshot Park for the Duke of Connaught, Queen Victoria's third son, who he had met in India when the duke was Commander-in-Chief of the Bombay Army from December 1886 to March 1890. This led to the Osborne House commission, and other work in Britain. Queen Victoria met him when he was working at Osborne in January 1891 and her diaries describe him as "a very intelligent, pleasant, nice man, a Seikh [sp. 'Sikh']; we looked at sketches he had made for the decoration of the room". He became Principal of Mayo School of Arts in 1910 and the following year he was made an MVO (Member of the Royal Victorian Order by King George V. He retired in 1913 and died in Lahore, three year later in 1916 aged 58.

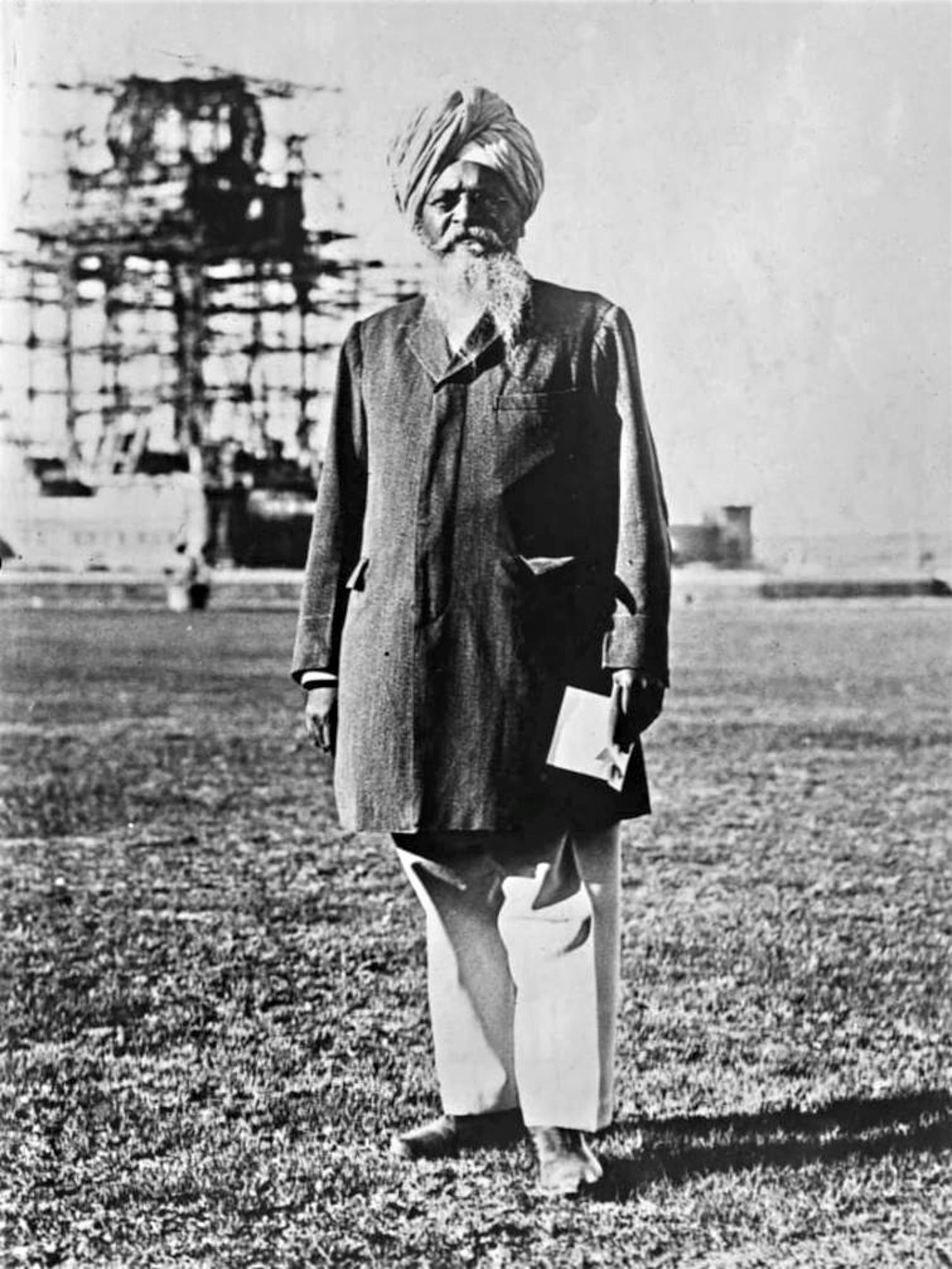
Bhai Ram Singh

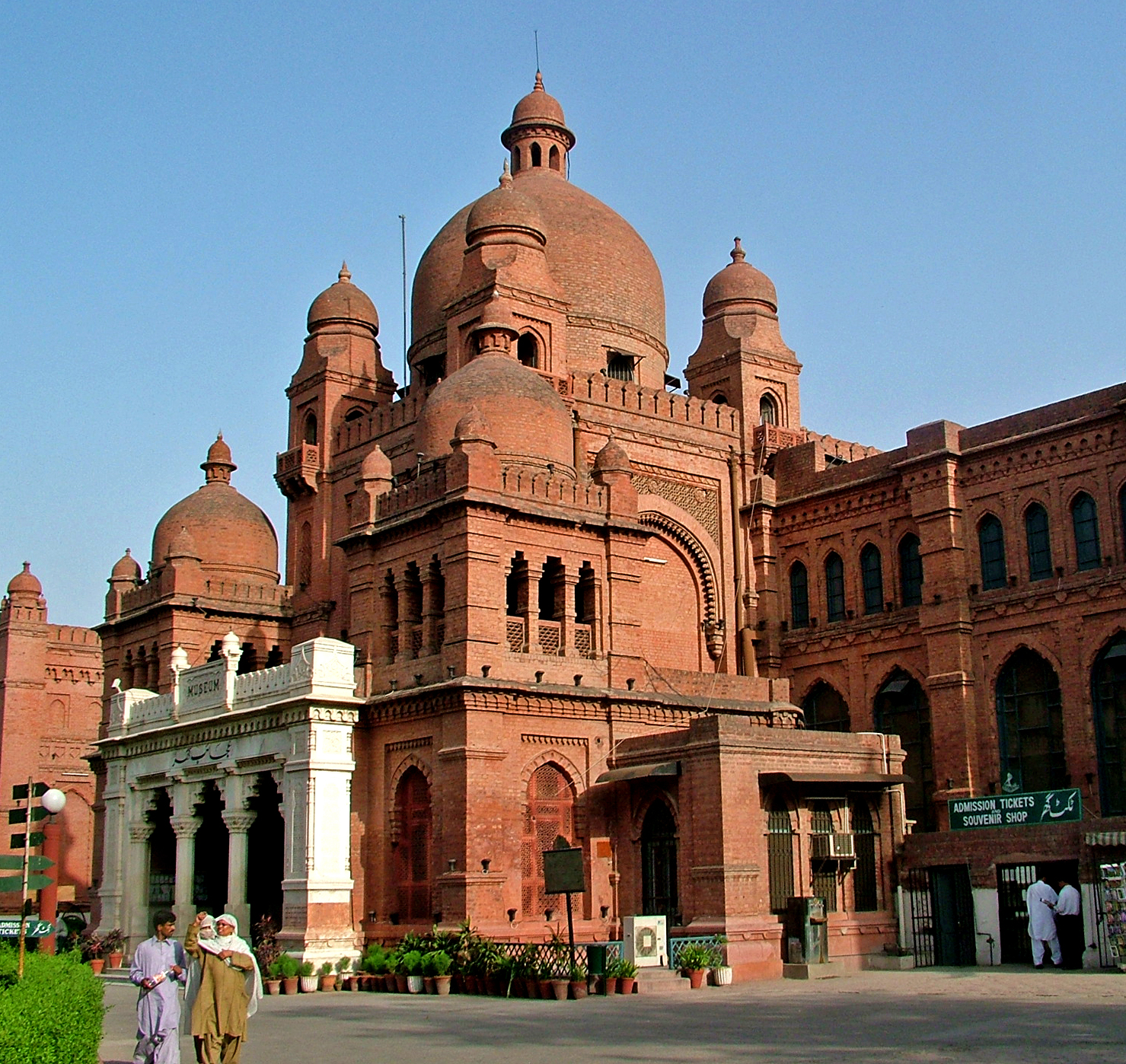
Lahore Museum, begun 1890

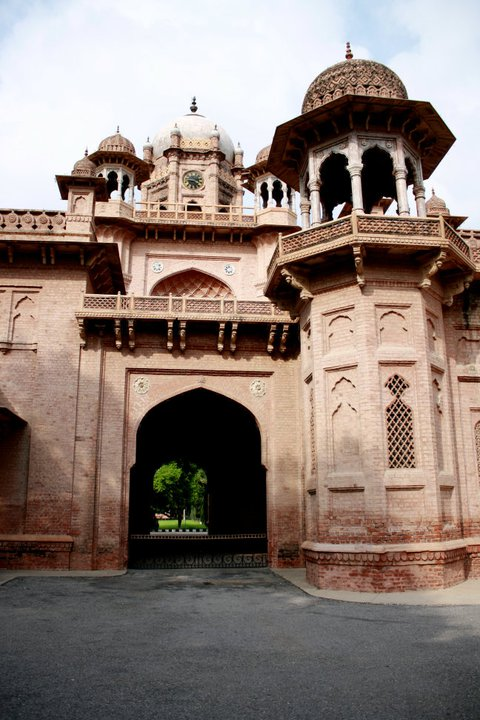
Aitchison College, begun 1886

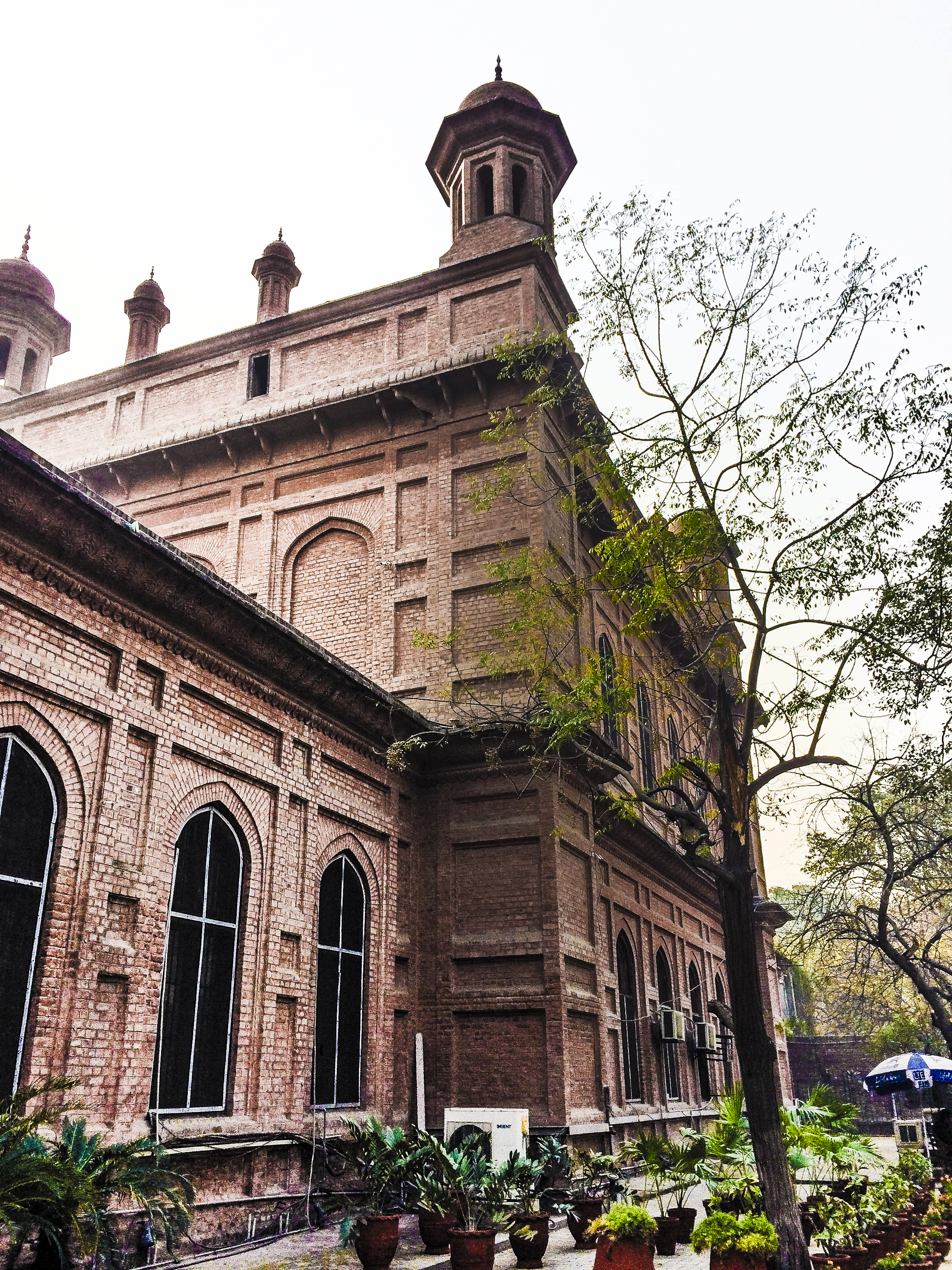
National College of Arts (Mayo School), Lahore

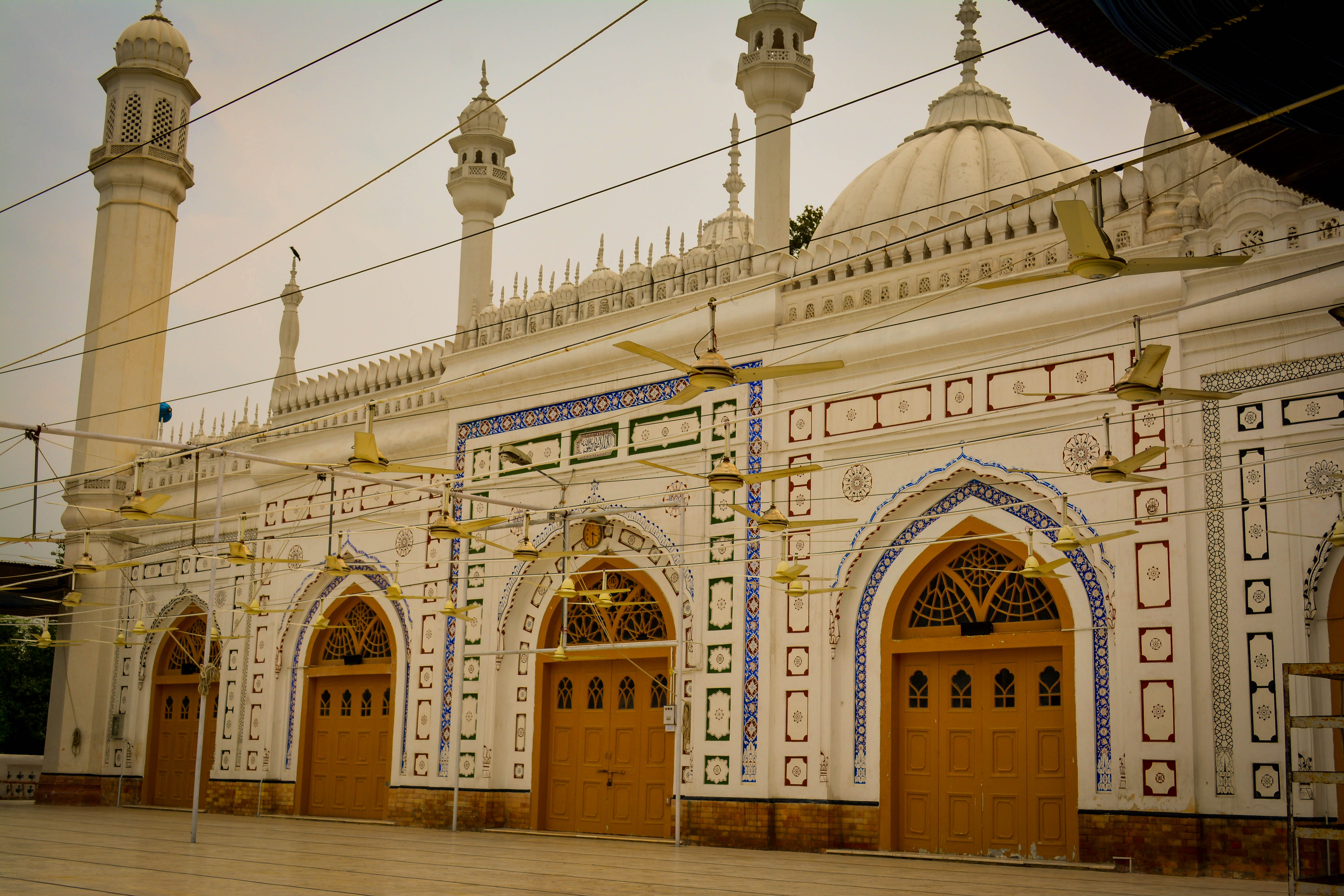
The mosque, Islamia College, Peshawar, 1913

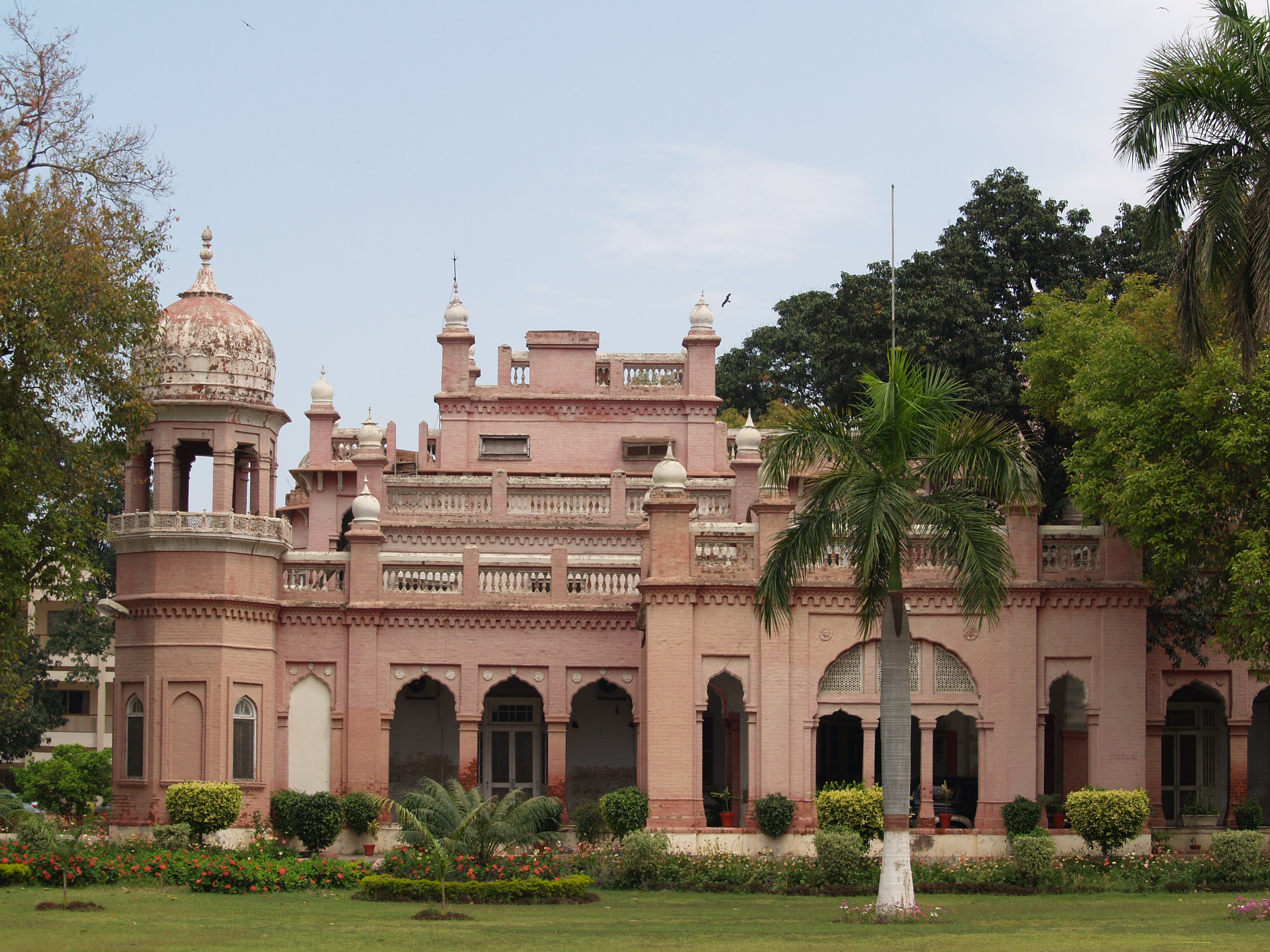
Chamba House, Lahore
