= Tollinton Market =

- ٹولنٹن مارکیٹ
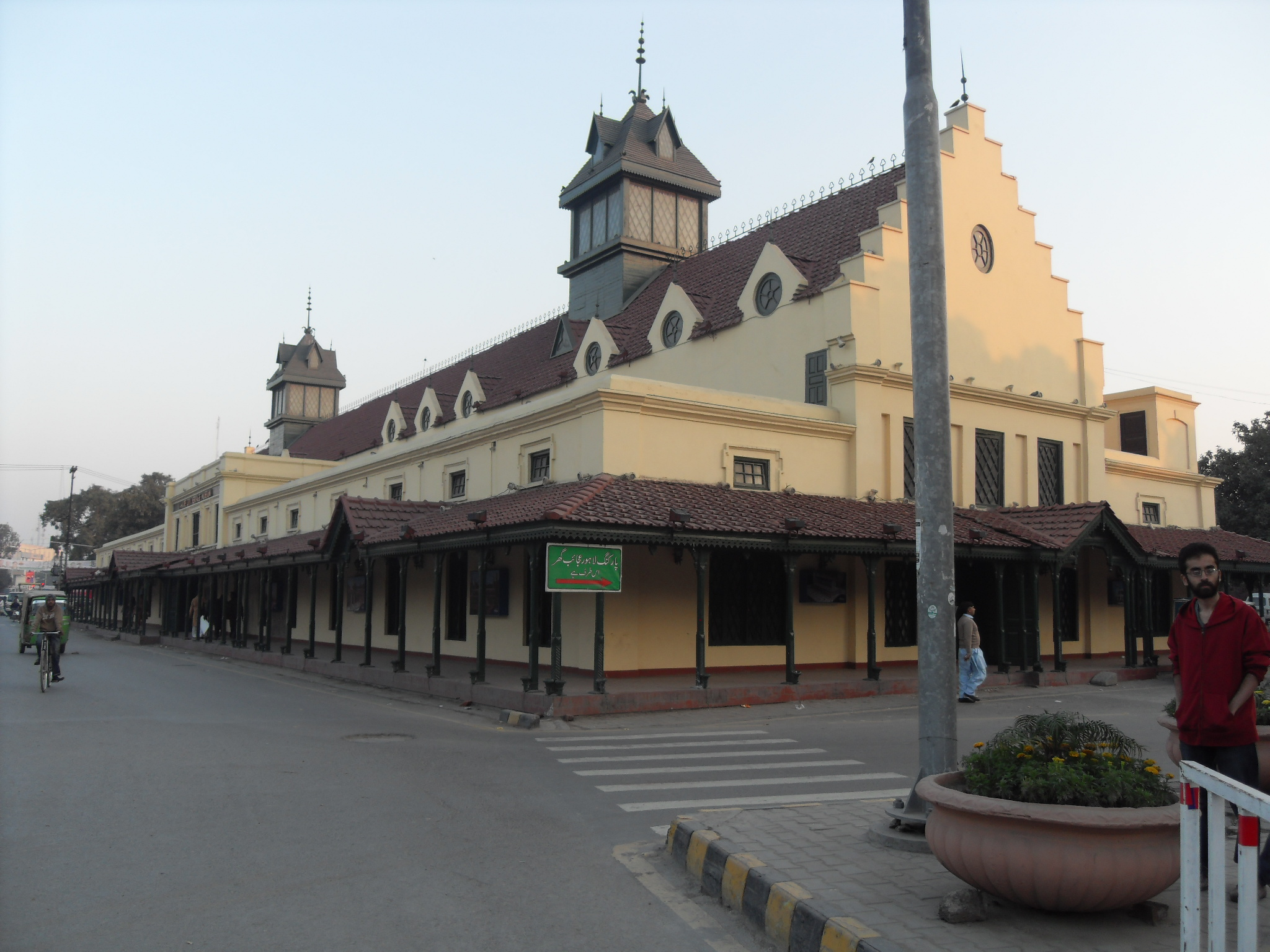
- Tollinton Market in 2008
- Former names: Punjab Exhibition Hall
- Alternative names: Lahore Heritage Museum

General information
- Status: In use
- Type: Market hall
- Architectural style: Anglo‑Indian colonial
- Location: The Mall, Lahore, Pakistan
- Coordinates: 31°34′4″N 74°18′34″E
- Groundbreaking: 1862
- Completed: 1864
- Renovated: 2005
- Owner: Government of the Punjab

Design and construction
- Architect: Francis Fowkes (Royal Engineers)

Tollinton Market, originally the Punjab Exhibition Hall, is the oldest purpose‑built colonial building on The Mall in Lahore, Pakistan. Conceived as the show‑piece of the Great Punjab Exhibition of 1864, the timber‑and‑brick hall later served as the city's first museum and, for much of the twentieth century, as Lahore's principal produce bazaar.

== History ==
Plans for a permanent exhibition hall were laid in the early 1860s after Queen Victoria directed that Punjab mount a display to rival London's International Exhibition of 1862. Francis Fowkes of the Royal Engineers supplied a prefabricated design copied from the South Kensington cluster of iron‑and‑glass halls, while construction in Lahore was driven by Assistant Commissioner, Henry Phillips Tollinton. The Great Punjab Exhibition opened on 20 January 1864.

When the fair closed, the building was retained for the nascent museum collection until the present Lahore Museum opened across the road in 1894. In 1920, the municipal engineer Ganga Ram remodelled the vacant hall as a covered municipal market that soon became known simply as Tollinton Market.

A five‑year campaign (1993–97) led by the Lahore Conservation Society saved the structure and allowed a first restoration completed in 2005, when it reopened as the Lahore Heritage Museum.
