= Standing Buddha from Gandhara =

Statue in the Tokyo National Museum

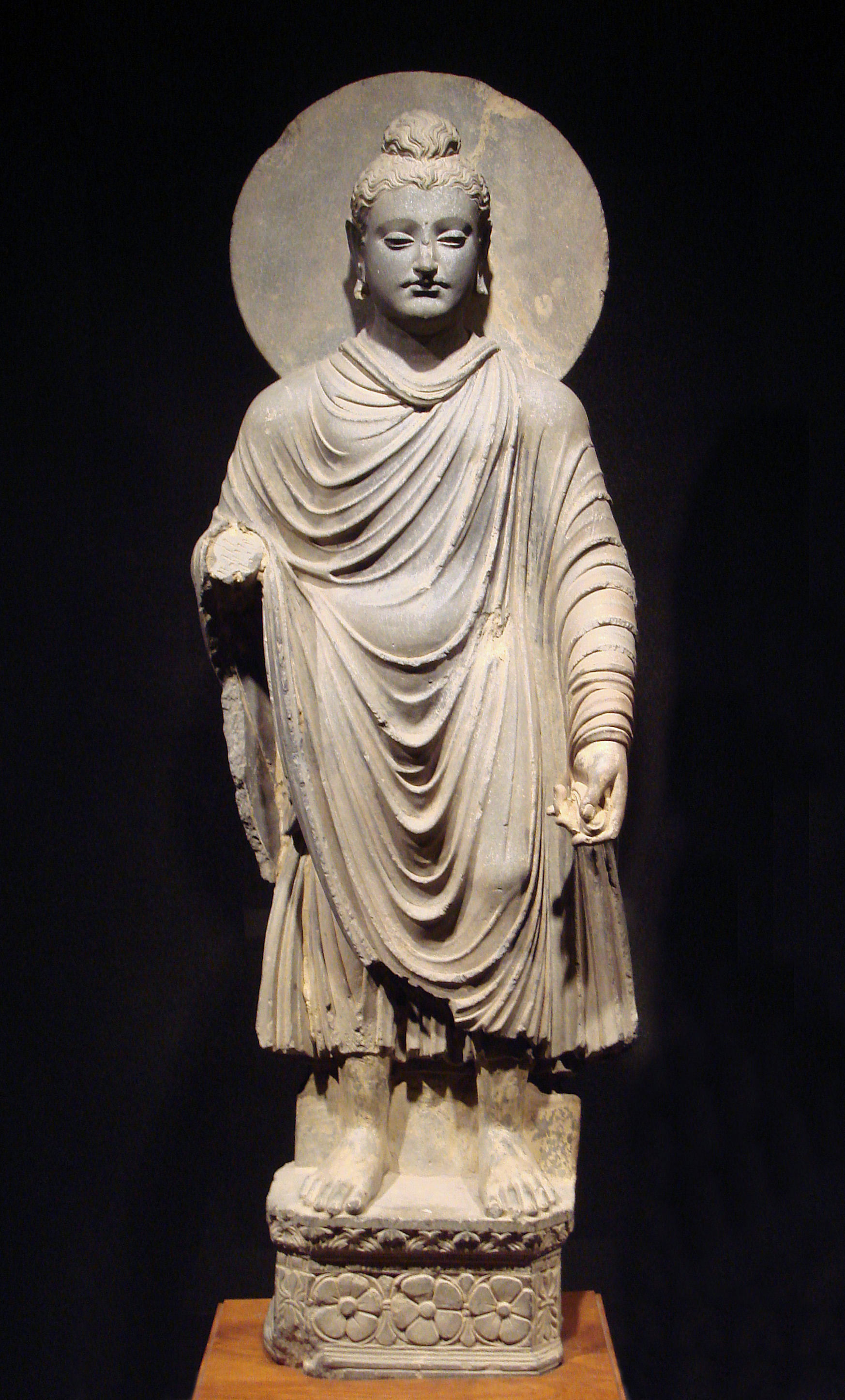
One of the first representations of the Buddha, 1st–2nd century AD, Gandhara in Pakistan.

The Standing Buddha of the Tokyo National Museum is an example of Greco-Buddhist statuary. Comparable ones can be found in the Guimet Museum in France, and in the National Museum, New Delhi besides various other museums of South Asia. The statue is dated by the museum to the 1st or 2nd century AD.

== Context ==
Some of the standing Buddhas (such as the example pictured) were sculpted using the specific Greek technique of making the hands and sometimes the feet in marble to increase the realistic effect, and the rest of the body in another material. It is also defined as the "Great Standing Buddha"

Alfred Charles Auguste Foucher especially considered Hellenistic free-standing Buddhas as "the most beautiful, and probably the most ancient of the Buddhas", assigning them to the 1st century BC, and making them the starting point of the anthropomorphic representations of the Buddha.

== Development ==
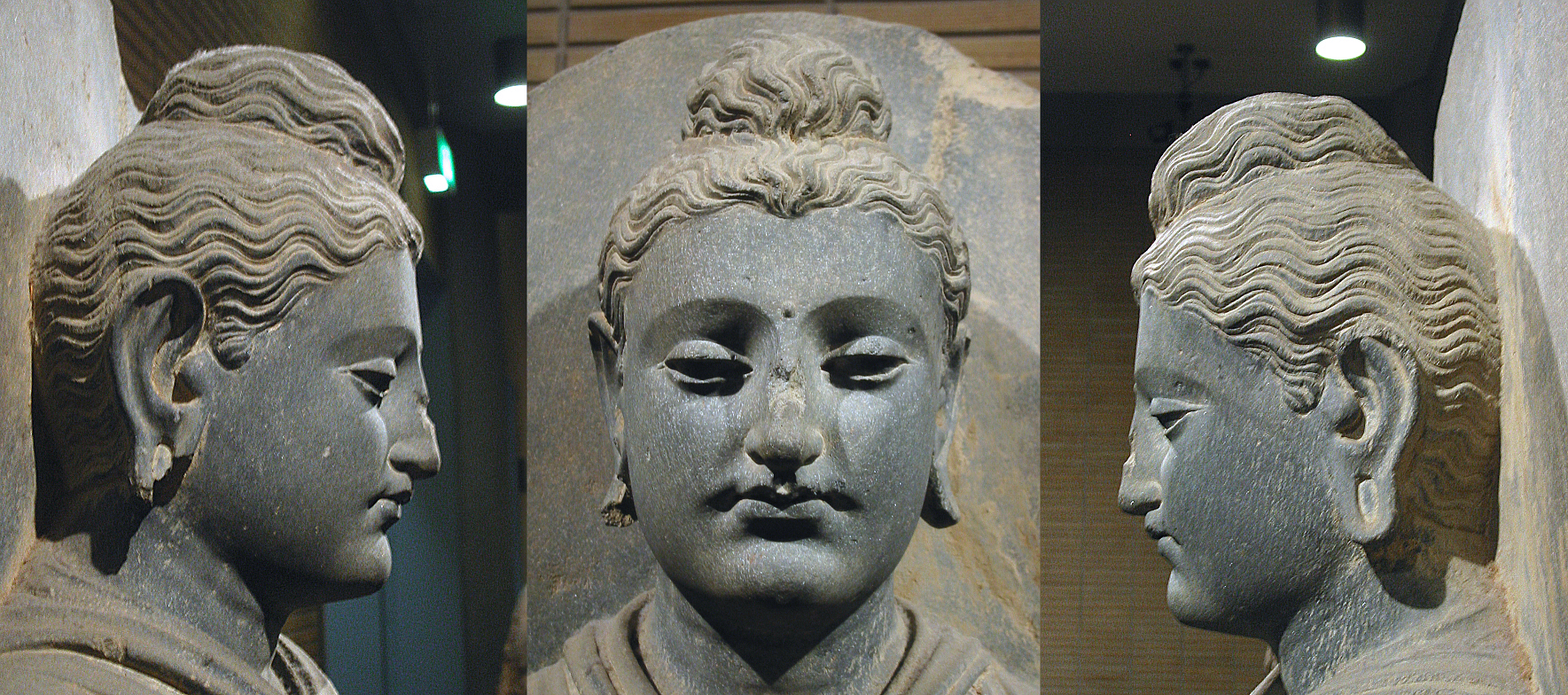
Face of the statue, from 3 angles.

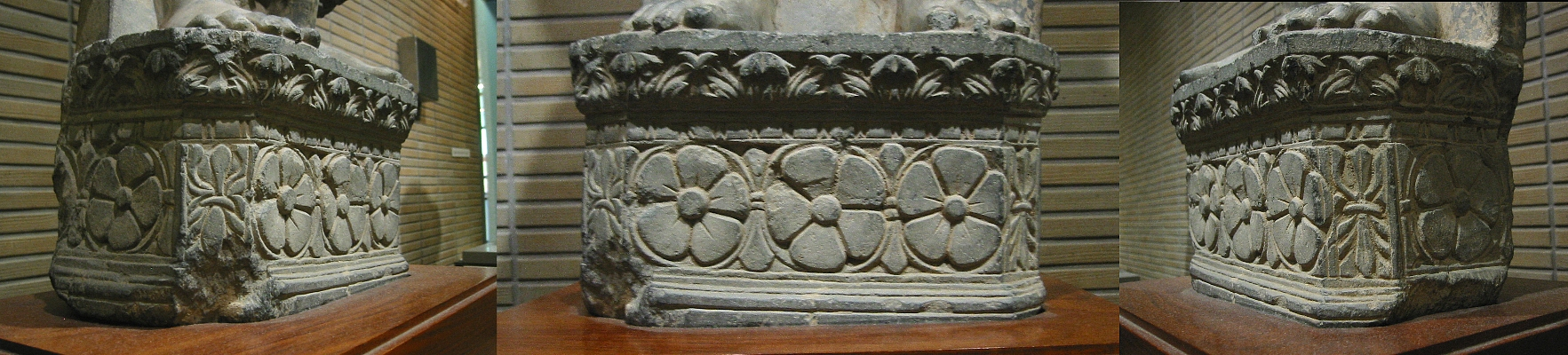
Base of the statue.

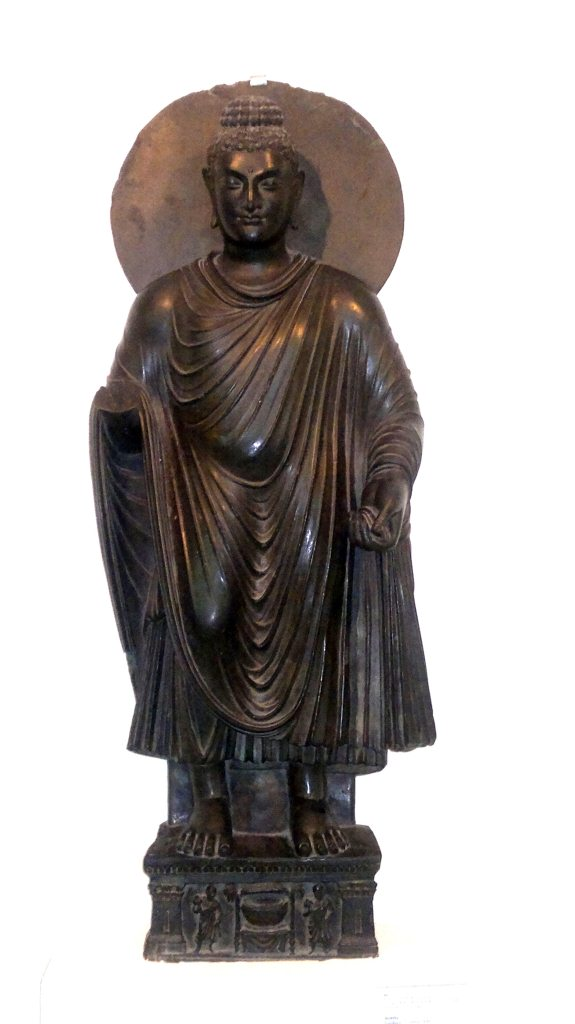
Standing Buddha, National Museum, New Delhi.

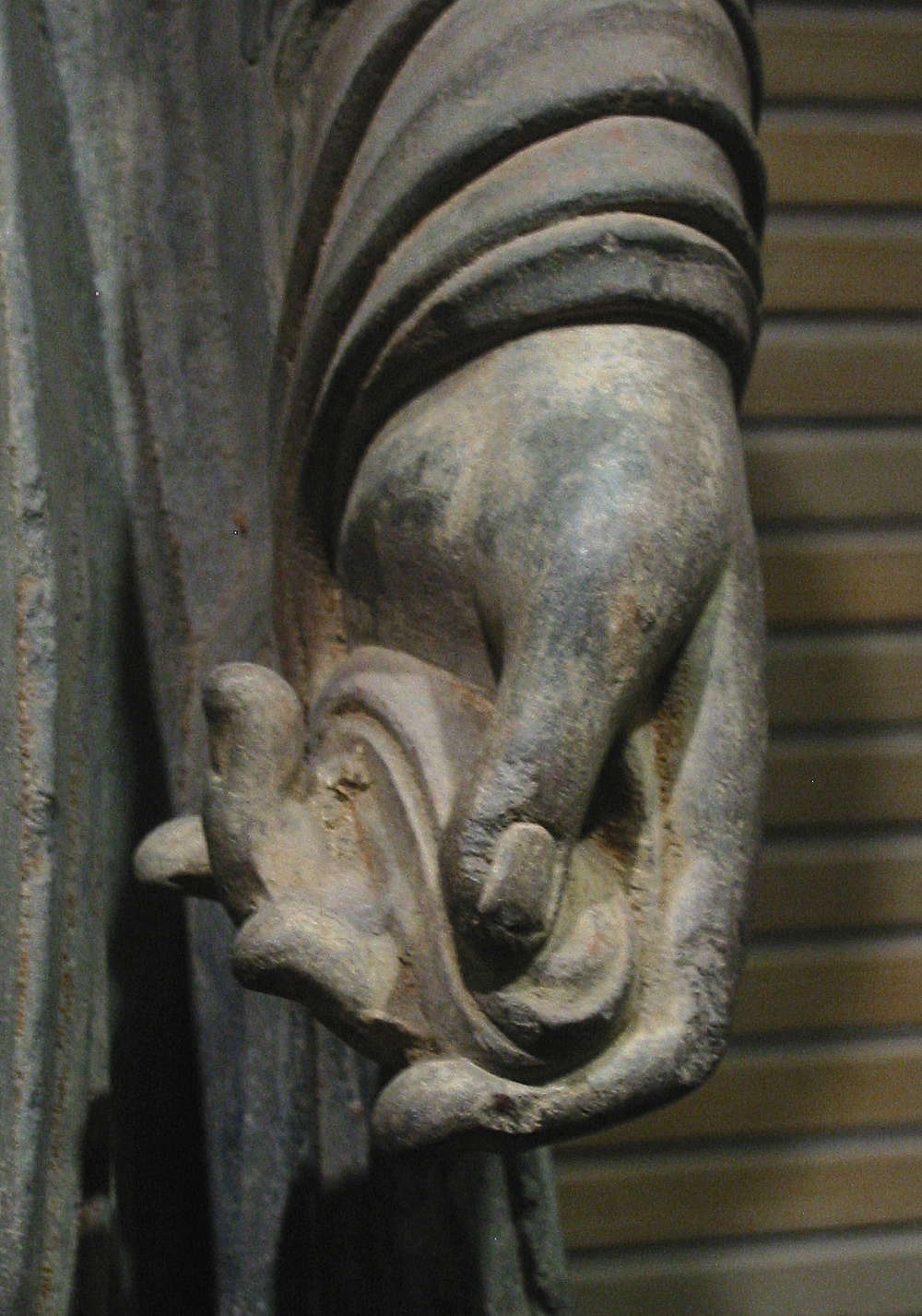
Hand detail.

From another direction, Chinese historical sources and mural paintings in the Tarim Basin city of Dunhuang accurately describe the travels of the explorer and ambassador Zhang Qian to Central Asia as far as Bactria around 130 BC, and the same murals describe the Emperor Han Wudi (156–87 BC) worshiping Buddhist statues, explaining them as "golden men brought in 120 BC by a great Han general in his campaigns against the nomads." Although there is no other mention of Han Wudi worshiping the Buddha in Chinese historical literature, the murals would suggest that statues of the Buddha were already in existence during the 2nd century BC, connecting them directly to the time of the Indo-Greeks.

Later, the Chinese historical chronicle Book of the Later Han describes the enquiry about Buddhism made around 67 AD by the emperor Emperor Ming (58–75 AD). He sent an envoy to the Yuezhi in northwestern India, who brought back paintings and statues of the Buddha, confirming their existence before that date:

"The Emperor, to discover the true doctrine, sent an envoy to Tianzhu (Northwestern India) to inquire about the Buddha's doctrine, after which paintings and statues [of the Buddha] appeared in the Middle Kingdom."

An Indo-Chinese tradition also explains that Nagasena, also known as the Indo-Greek King Menander's Buddhist teacher, created in 43 BC in the city of Pataliputra a statue of the Buddha, the Emerald Buddha, which was later brought to Thailand.

== See also ==
- Fasting Buddha from Gandhara
- Seated Buddha from Gandhara
