= Faridkot House, Lahore =

Residence and later office

Faridkot House
- Interactive map of the Faridkot House area

General information
- Status: Demolished
- Type: Residence; later office
- Architectural style: Blend of Mughal architecture and British architecture
- Location: Between Mozang Road and Begum Road, Lahore, Punjab, Pakistan
- Coordinates: 31°32′55″N 74°18′54″E
- Current tenants: Evacuee Trust Property Board
- Owner: Raja of Faridkot State

Technical details
- Grounds: Extensive gardens with date palms and trees imported from Kenya, Uganda and Tanganyika

Fairdkot House was a building in Lahore, Punjab which served as a residence of the Raja of Faridkot.

== History ==
The area where it was located, between Mozang Road and Begum Road, was once known as Shutarkhana. This name originated from the camel lines that were situated there when Anarkali served as the cantonment. The house itself, along with another adjoining it, was originally owned by William Kirke. Near the junction of Lytton and Edwardes Roads stood an old, neglected bungalow known as Bleak House. Eventually, Shahdi Lal's residence was built on the site of Bleak House.

Kirkie’s property later came into the possession of the Raja of Faridkot. Faridkot was a princely state in India, and its ruler was entitled to a salute of eleven guns.

When the fifth annual conference of Indian Mohammedan Ladies was held in Lahore from 3 to 5 March 1918, the Raja of Faridkot placed Faridkot House at the disposal of the delegates for a week. The conference was organized under the charge of Mrs. Mian Muhammad Shafi and Mrs. Mian Shah Din. Some of the 400 ladies who came from Aligarh, Allahabad, Amritsar, Bulandshahr, Delhi, Jammu, Lahore, Ludhiana, Lucknow, Meerut, Rawalpindi, and Sialkot to attend the conference were accommodated here.

Following the Partition of India in 1947, the building was taken over by the Evacuee Property Board and repurposed by the Settlement Department. It housed the Property Claims Office where individuals displaced by partition filed claims for their lost properties. Over time, the building deteriorated due to overuse, neglect, and vandalism, and was eventually demolished.

There is also a Faridkot House in Delhi, India.

== Architecture ==
Faridkot House was constructed using British bricks and featured an architectural blend of Mughal and Western styles. The entrance was marked by a tall, multi-foiled arch surmounted by a half-dome, with crenellations along the parapet. Stucco rosettes adorned the spandrels of the arch. The estate was surrounded by extensive gardens featuring date palms and trees imported from Kenya, Uganda, and Tanganyika, as well as banyan and peepal trees, believed to be centuries old. It included quarters for servants, kitchens, garages for carriages, stables for horses, tube wells, and electric poles. The interiors were furnished with carpets, curtains, chandeliers, and other fittings. The residence featured verandahs with ventilators for air and light, cast-iron circular staircases, waterspouts, and chimneys for the fireplaces.

== See also ==
- Faridkot State
- Faridkot House
- Chamba House, Lahore
