= Fasting Buddha from Gandhara =

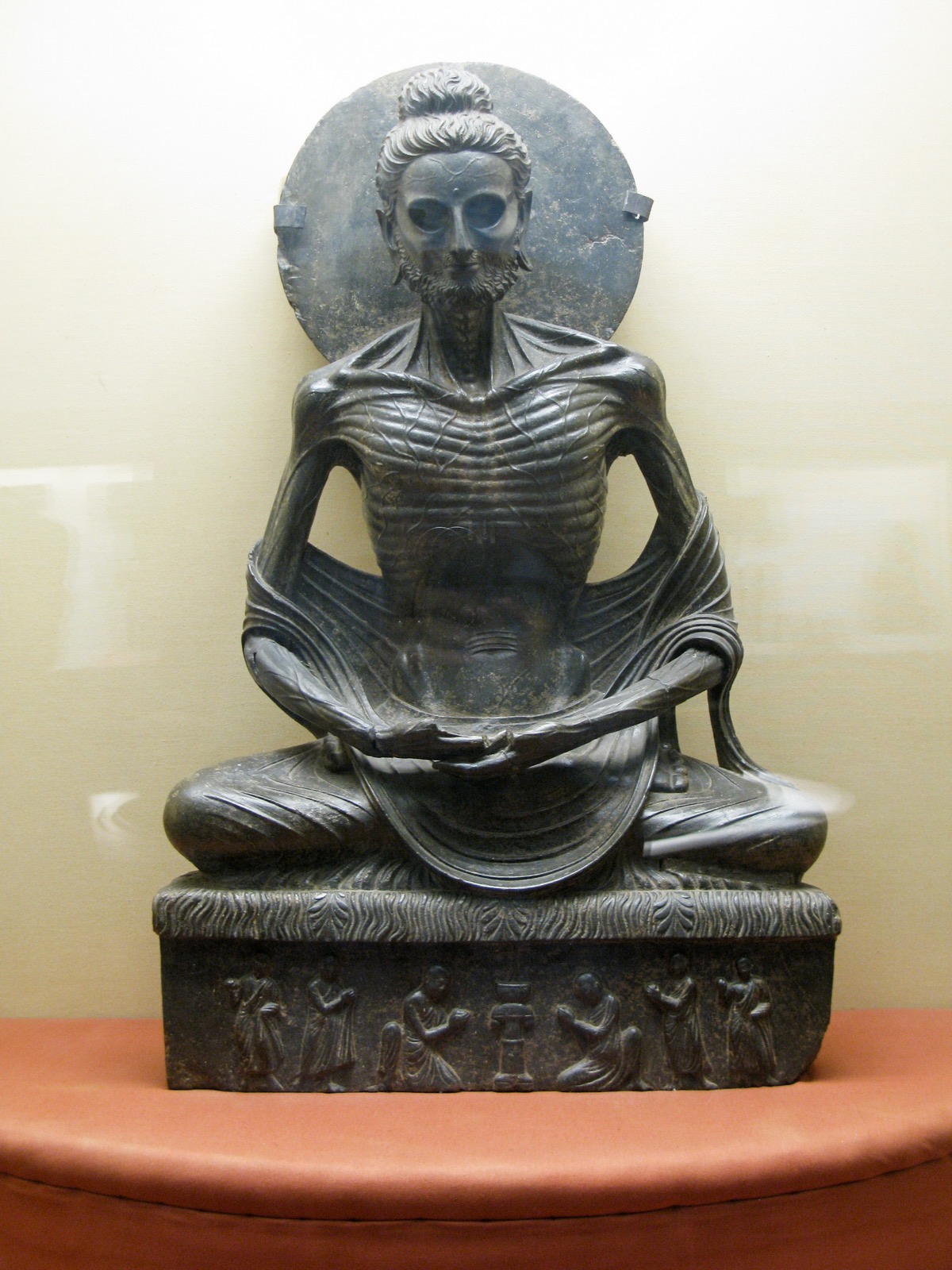
Fasting Buddha from Gandhara, 2nd century CE, Lahore Museum.

Fasting Buddha from Gandhara or Fasting Siddhartha is a 2nd century CE Gandharan sculpture, discovered from Sikri, near modern-day Taxila, in Punjab, Pakistan.

== Discovery ==
The sculpture was discovered during excavations of Sikri Stupa by British archaeologist HA Deane. It was donated to the Lahore Museum in 1894, during the tenure of John Lockwood Kipling, where it remains till date.

== Description ==
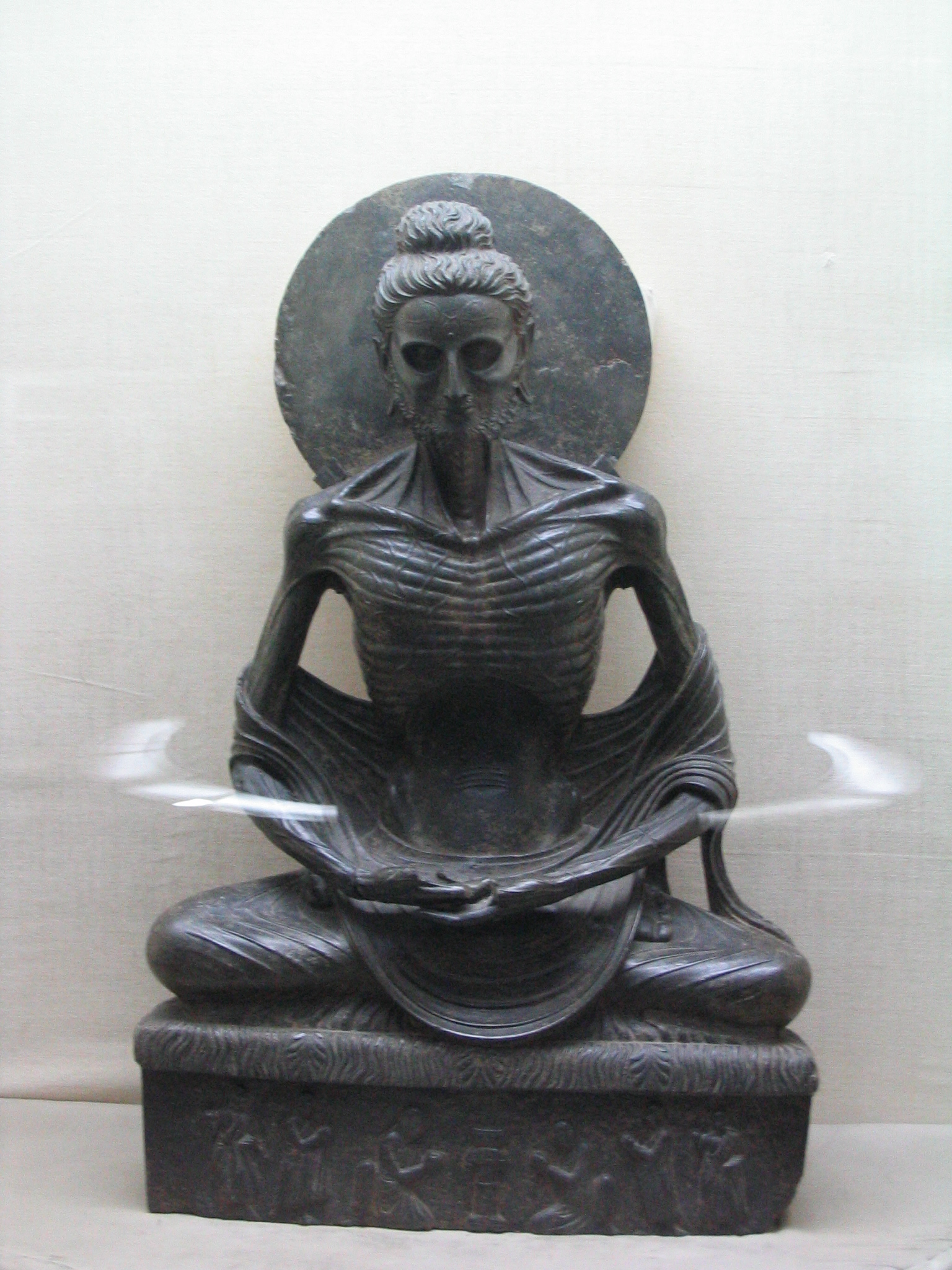
Fasting Buddha from Gandhara, 2nd century CE, Lahore Museum.

The Fasting Buddha is considered one of the finest examples of Gandhara art, named after the region of Gandhara in northwestern Pakistan. Created from grey schist stone, it depicts the fasting and emanciated Siddhartha Gautama or Buddha Shakyamuni before he achieved Enlightenment. The sculpture is 84 cm tall, 53 cm wide, and 25 cm in depth.

The statue was digitised in 2025.

== See also ==
- Standing Buddha from Gandhara (Tokyo)
- Seated Buddha from Gandhara
