= Seated Buddha from Gandhara =

Gandharan sculpture in the British Museum

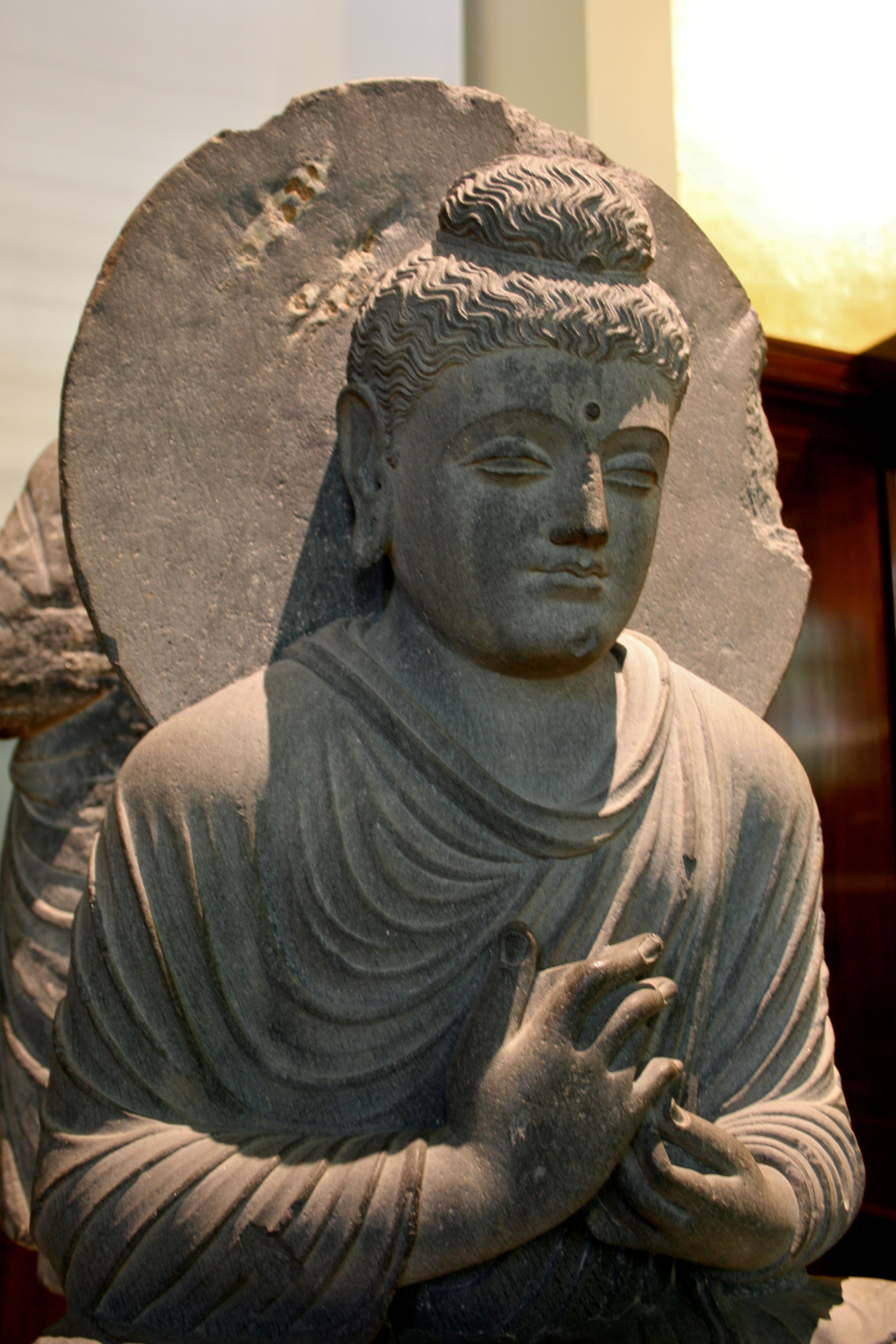
- Seated Buddha from Gandhara on display in the British Museum
- Material: schist (stone)
- Size: Height: 95 cm Width: 53 cm Depth: 24 cm
- Period/culture: c. 2nd - 3rd Century AD
- Place: Jamal Garhi, Gandhara, Pakistan (Present-day Khyber Pakhtunkhwa, Pakistan)
- Present location: Room 22, British Museum, London

The Seated Buddha from Gandhara is an early surviving statue of the Buddha discovered at the site of Jamal Garhi in ancient Gandhara in modern-day Pakistan, that dates to the 2nd or 3rd century AD during the Kushan Empire. Statues of the "enlightened one" were not made until the 1st century CE. Before that, Buddha were generally represented by aniconic symbols. Like other Gandharan, Greco-Buddhist, and Kushan art pieces, the statue shows influence from Ancient Greek art depicting Buddhist themes. The sculpture is now in room 22 of the British Museum, catalogued as 1895, 1026.1.

== Description ==
The statue was carved in schist, allowing very fine detail. The pose illustrates Buddha's first sermon on "setting in motion the Wheel of Law" at the deer park at Sarnath near Varanasi in Uttar Pradesh. The statue was made in the 2nd or 3rd century and although Buddha lived in the 6th and 5th centuries before Christ, this is still a quite early statue. Statues of the "enlightened one" were not made until the 1st century AD. For the first four hundred years after his death Buddha was represented by symbols alone such as his footprint. This statue was used as the inspiration of a BBC Radio 4 programme in the series called A History of the World in 100 Objects in May 2010. The programme discussed the change that allowed Buddha to be represented by a statue instead of as previously by symbols alone.

The figure of the Buddha is shown on a cushion on a throne or platform. On the front of the throne there are much smaller figures of a bodhisattva with a turban and halo, flanked by kneeling figures of a male and female probably representing donor portraits of a couple who paid for the statue.

== Similar statues ==
There is a similar statue carved from black schist at Yale University Art Gallery Another comparable statue was sold by Christie's in September 2009 for $218,500. That statue dated from the same time and place and was 26 inches high. These Buddhas are widely considered to be the rarest of all Buddhist sculptures and despite iconoclasm, they can be found in the museums of France, Germany, Japan, Korea, China, India, and Afghanistan as well as those still remaining in Pakistan.

== Gallery ==
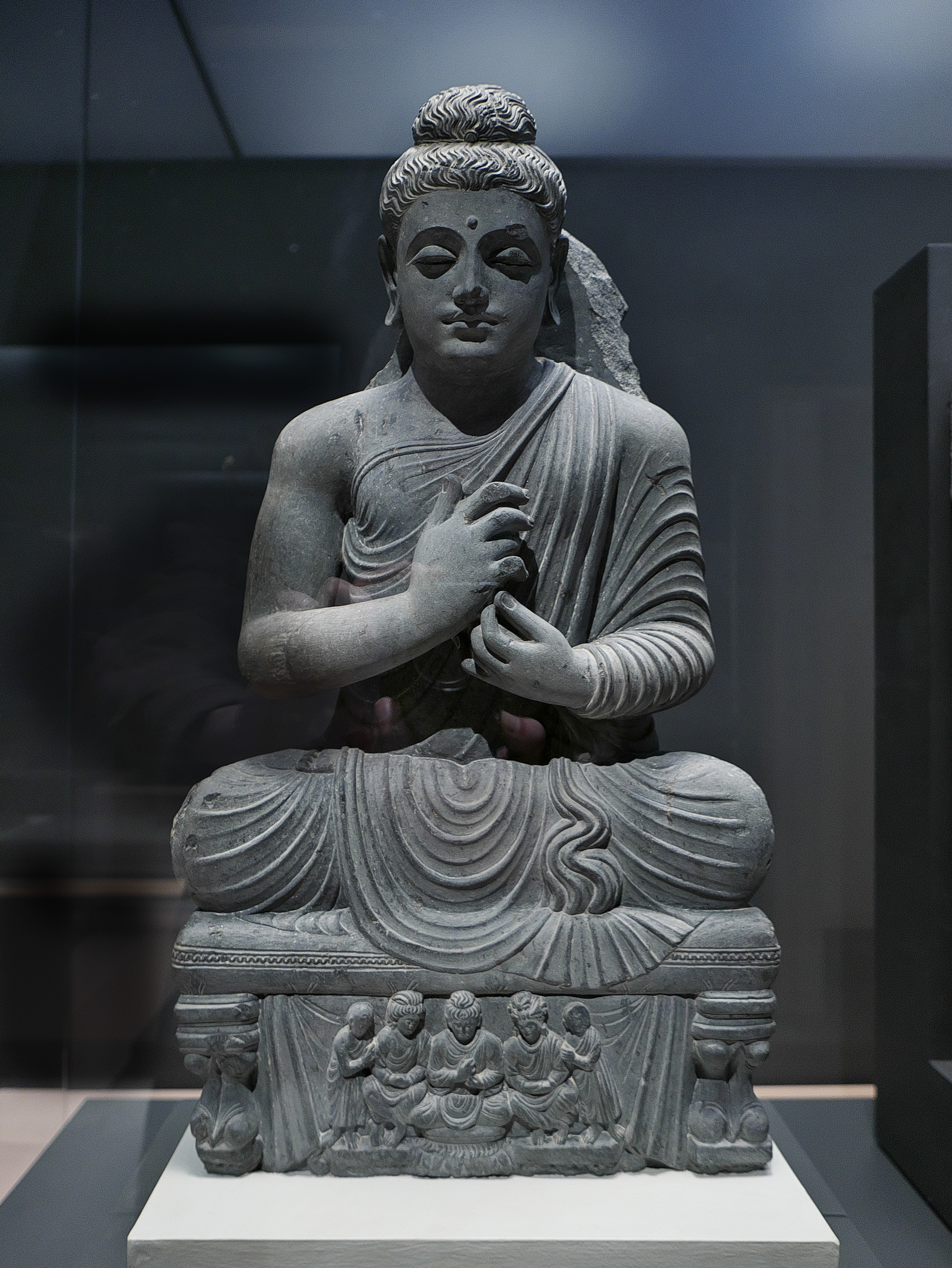
A different Gandharan figure in the British Museum (1880.217)

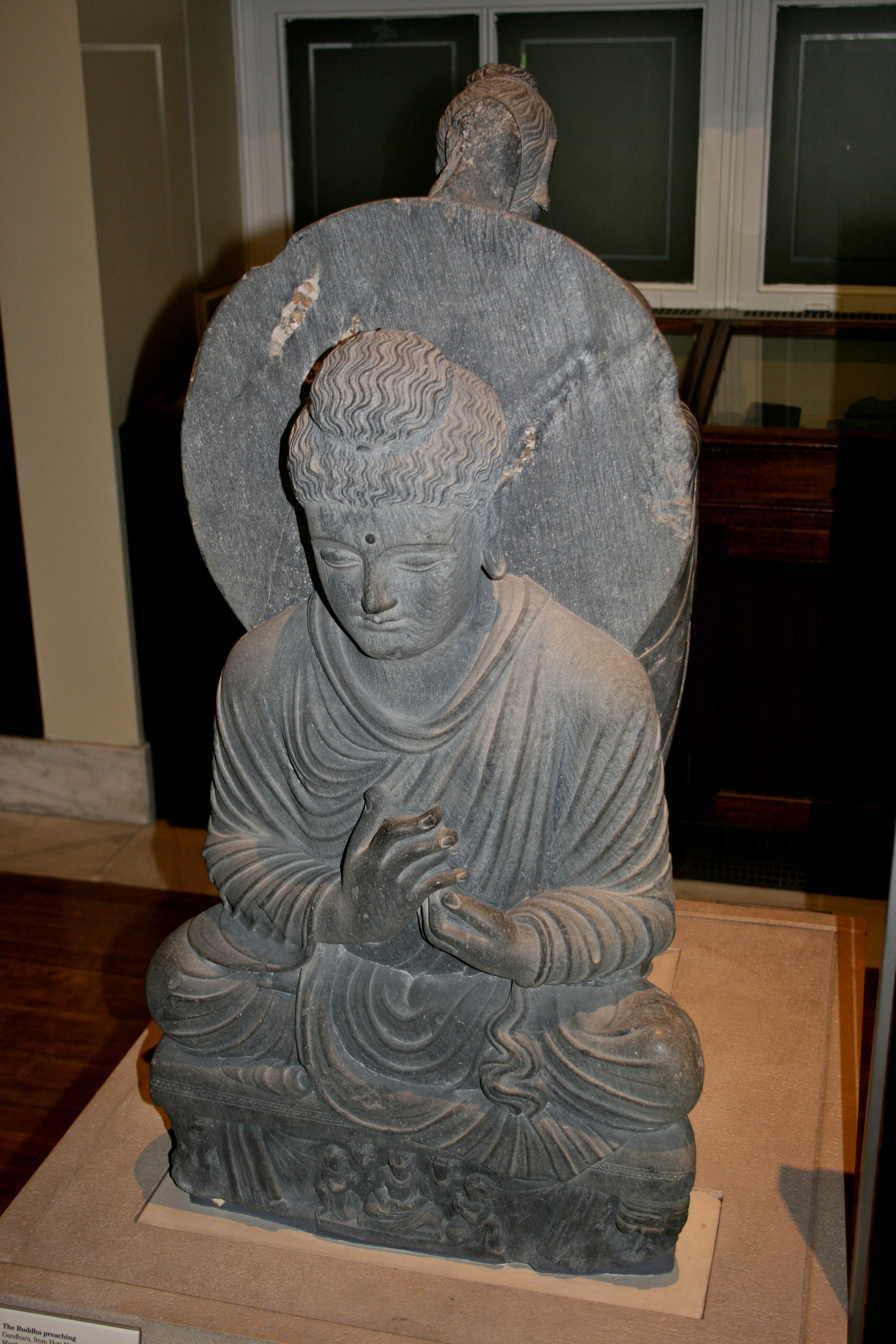
Another view of the seated Buddha in the British Museum

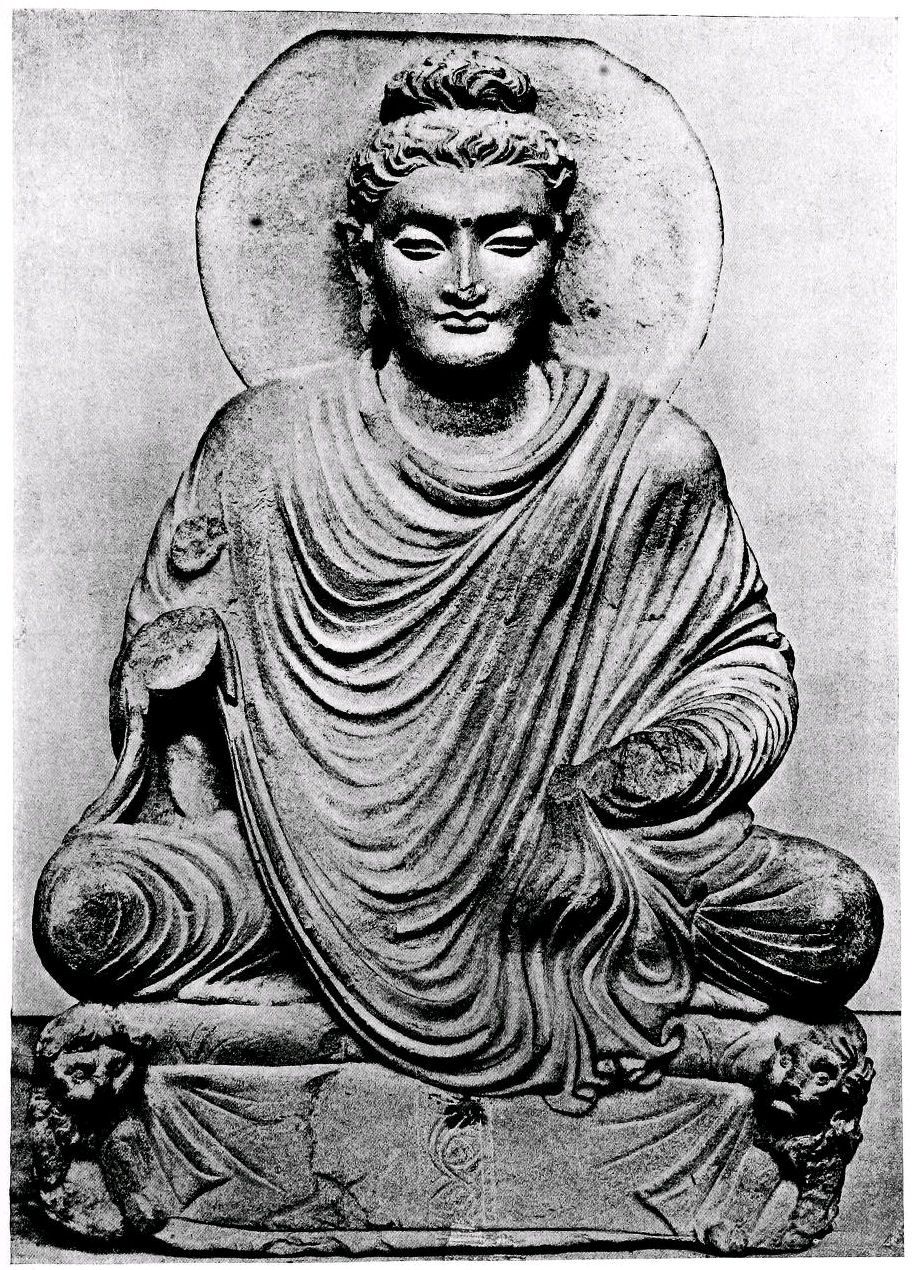
Seated Buddha, Gandhara, Berlin Museum.

== See also ==
- Standing Buddha from Gandhara
- Fasting Buddha from Gandhara

Preceded by 40: Empress Pepper Pot	A History of the World in 100 Objects; Object 41	Succeeded by 42: Gold coin of Kumaragupta I
