= Lahore: History and Architecture of Mughal Monuments =

Non-Fiction Book

- Author: Anjum Rehmani
- Language: English
- Genre: Architecture, History, Asia, India, South Asia
- Published: Year 2016, Publisher Oxford University Press
- Publisher: Oxford University Press
- Publication place: Pakistan
- ISBN: 978-0199066094

Lahore: History and Architecture of Mughal Monuments is a non-fiction book by Anjum Rehmani, published on 7 September 2016 by Oxford University Press. The book covers the history of old Lahore and its constructions. Main focus of book is on the history and architecture of India and South Asia.

== Reception ==
Writing in The Express Tribune, Tara Kashif called the book "an exquisitely-designed journey of the architectural splendour of Mughal monuments in Lahore.. a visual, aesthetic celebration of the Mughal grandeur combined with a chronological, comprehensive exploratory account of the concrete vestiges of the long-lost Mughal era." In Dawn, Rabela Junejo called it "neither lyrical nor poetic. On the contrary, it is a very well-researched volume referenced with supporting photographs."
