= Family of Gautama Buddha =

Family of the founder of Buddhism

The Buddha was born into a noble family in Lumbini in 563 BCE as per historical events and 624 BCE according to Buddhist tradition. He was called Siddhartha Gautama in his childhood. His father was king Śuddhodana, leader of the Shakya clan in what was the growing state of Kosala, and his mother was queen Maya. According to Buddhist legends, the baby exhibited the marks of a great man. A prophecy indicated that, if the child stayed at home, he was destined to become a world ruler. If the child left home, however, he would become a universal spiritual leader. To make sure the boy would be a great king and world ruler, his father isolated him in his palace and he was raised by his mother's younger sister, Mahapajapati Gotami, after his mother died just seven days after childbirth.

Separated from the world, he later married Yaśodharā (Yaśodharā was the daughter of King Suppabuddha and Amita), and together they had one child: a son named Rāhula. Both Yashodhara and Rāhula later became disciples of Buddha.

== Suddhodana ==
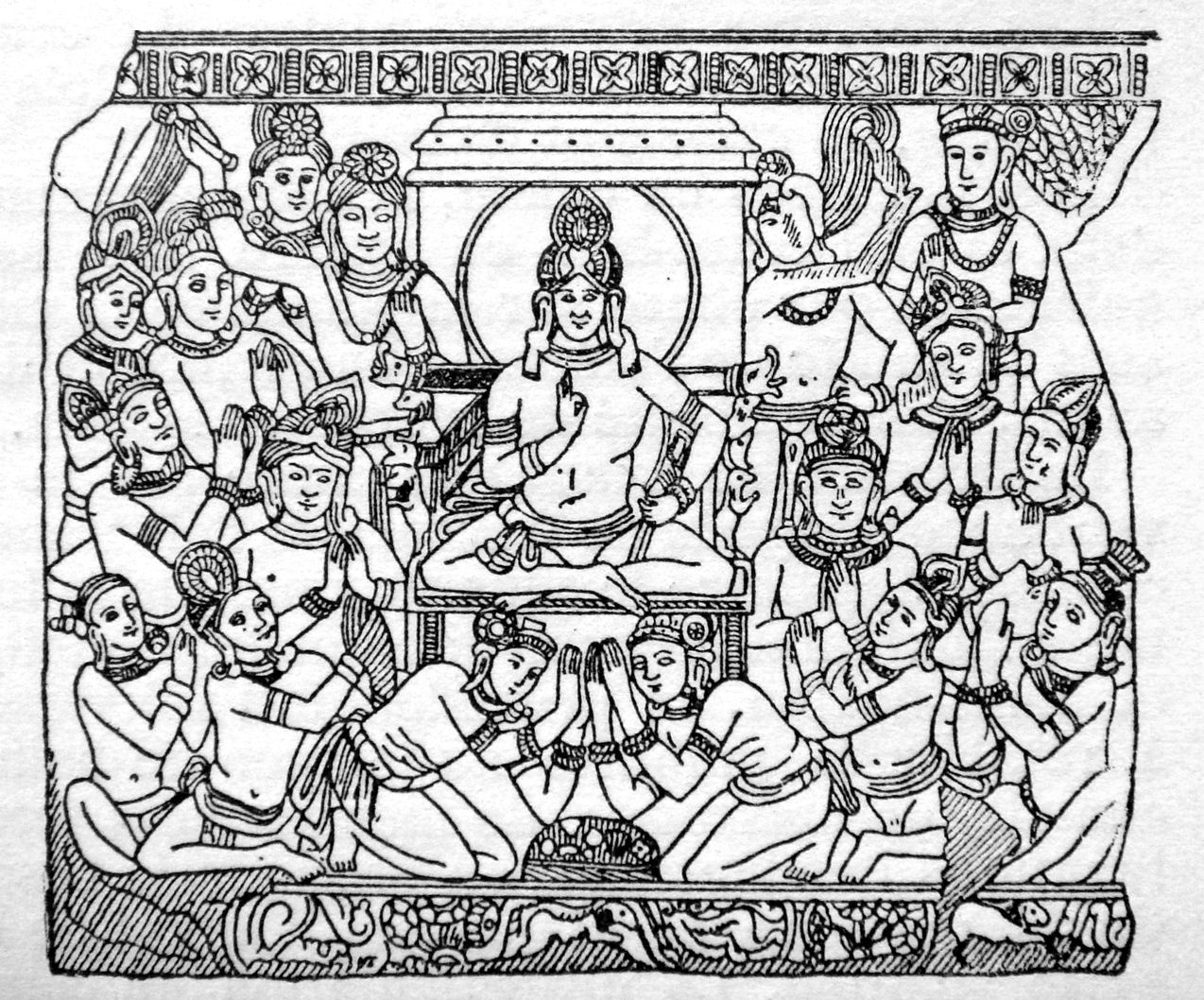
King Sudhodana and his court

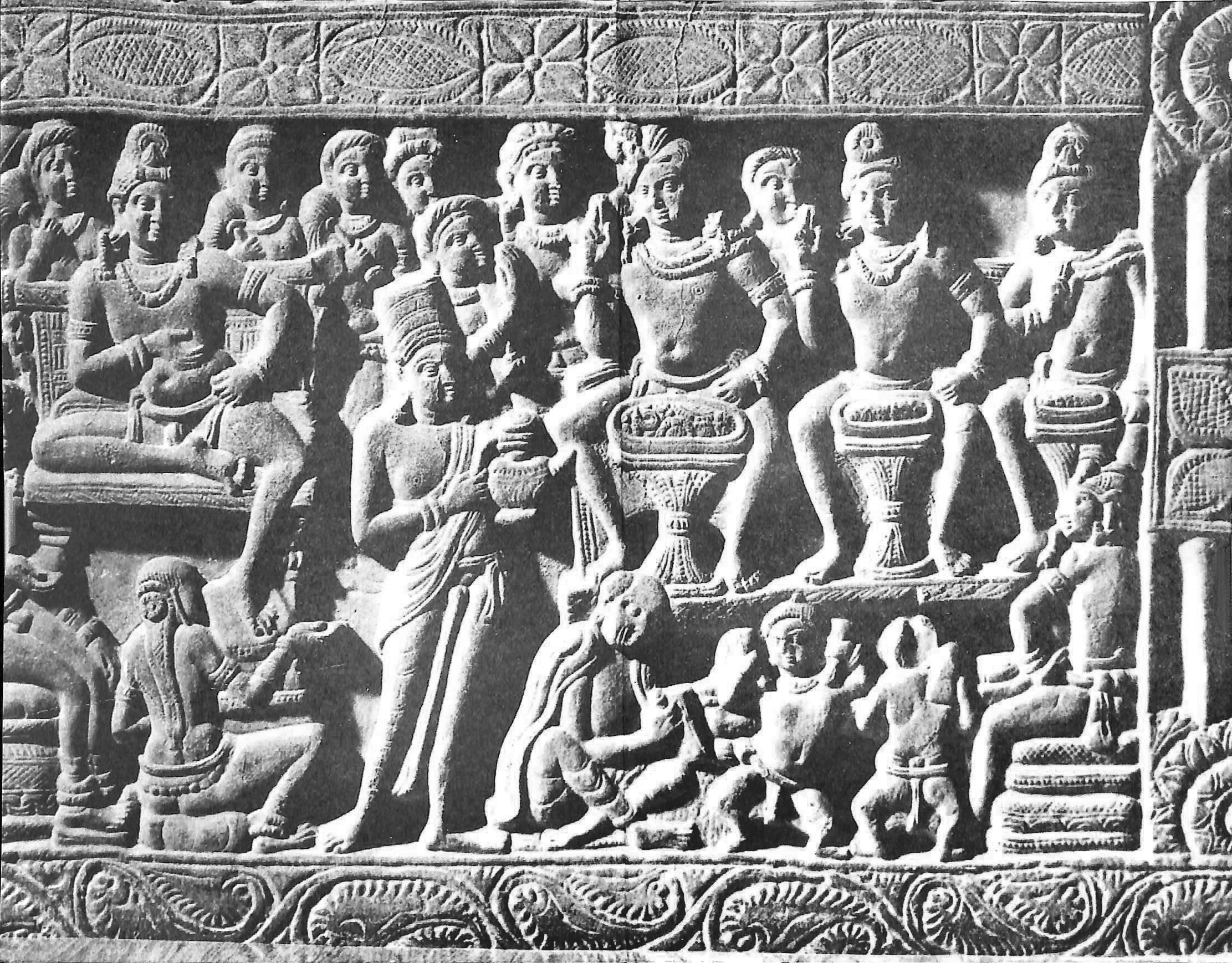
The sculpture depicts a scene where three soothsayers are interpreting to King Suddhodana the dream of Queen Maya. Nagarjunakonda, 2nd-century

Much of the information on Suddhodana comes from Buddhist legend and scripture. He is believed to be a leader of the Shakya clan, who lived within the state of Kosala, on the northern border of History of Lumbini, Nepal. Although in Buddhist literature he is said to be a hereditary monarch, he is now believed to have been an elected head of a tribal confederacy. Suddhodana's father was King Sinahana and his mother was Queen Kachchana. Suddhodana married two Princesses from koliya kingdom. He was the only king who had more than one queen of his clan. Queen Maya was the eldest daughter of Koliya king Anjana and Prajapati Gotami was the youngest daughter. Siddhartha, who later became Buddha, was the only son born to Queen Maya. Prajapati Gotami had a daughter Sundari Nanda and a son Nanda with Suddhodana. According to Theravada texts Sundari Nanda was the eldest among his three children. While Siddhartha was the second born and Nanda was the youngest of the family.

Suddhodana was said to be greatly troubled by the departure of his son and is reported in Buddhist scriptures to have sent 10,000 messengers to plead with Gautama to return. After the Buddha preached the dharma to the messengers, they were all ordained into the sangha. Later, a friend of Suddhodana named Kaludayi invited the Buddha to return, at the request of Suddhodana. The Buddha also preached the dharma to him and Kaludayi was later ordained as a monk.

After this request from his father Gautama Buddha returned to his father's kingdom where he preached dharma to him. Gautama later returned again to his father's kingdom to see his father's death. Suddhodana became an arahant.

== Maya ==
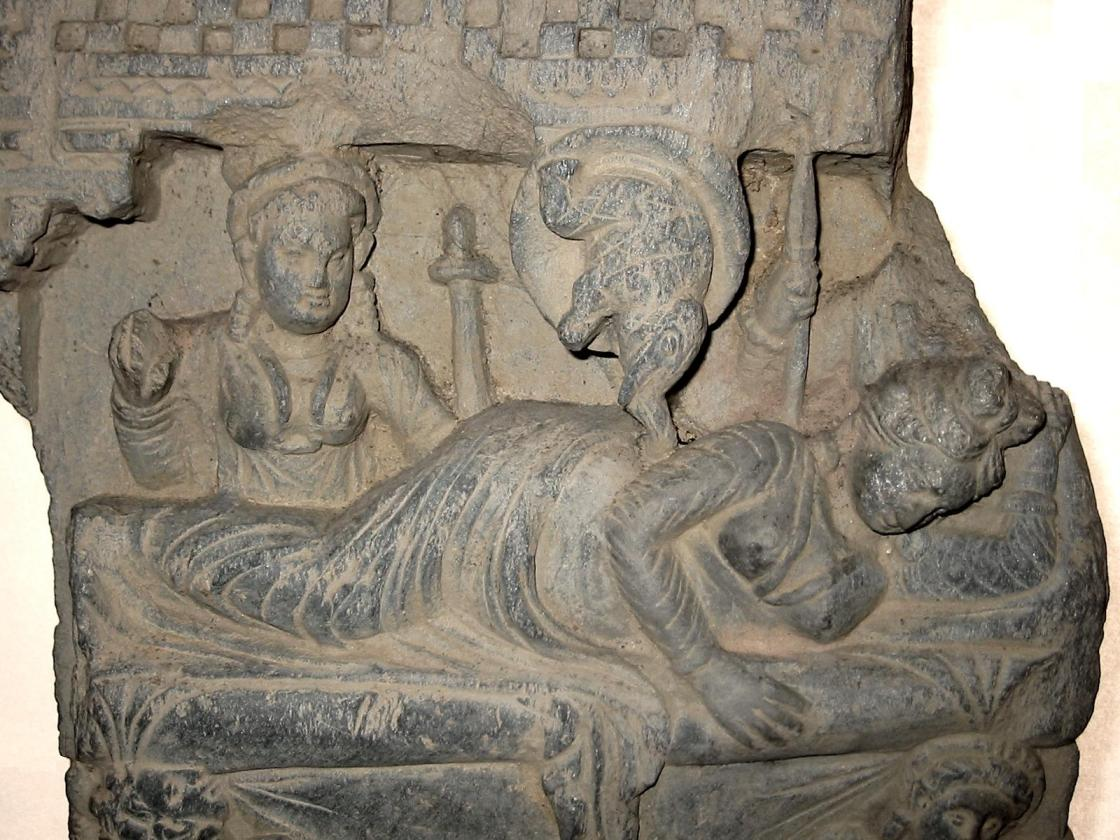
Queen Māyā's white elephant dream, and the conception of the Buddha. Gandhara, 2-3rd century CE.

Maya was the mother of the Buddha and was from the Koliyan clan. Maya was born in Devadaha. She was married to her cousin King Suddhodana, who ruled in the kingdom of Kapilavastu.

In Buddhist texts, a white elephant was said to have entered her side during a dream. When she awoke she found that she was pregnant. As it was traditional to give birth in the homeland of the father, Queen Maya journeyed to Devadaha. However, she was forced to give birth en route, in the Lumbini grove. It is said that the Devas presided over the birth and that two streams, one cool and one hot, flowed down from the heavens.

Maya died seven days after the birth of her son, whom she had named Siddhartha or "he who achieves his aim." She is said, in Buddhist scriptures, to have been reborn in Tusita, where her son later visited her, paid respects and taught the dharma to her.

== Yaśodharā ==
Princess Yaśodharā was the wife of Siddhartha who later became Gautama Buddha. She was the daughter of Koliya king Suppabuddha and Queen Amitha.

Siddhartha and Yaśodharā were first cousins. Yaśodharā's father was the brother of Queen Maya and Mahapajapati Gotami while her mother Amitha was the sister of King Suddhodana. Yaśodharā was married to Siddhartha at the age of sixteen and both of them shared respect and rapport with each other but it is also said they both didn't have much desires toward marital life. It took long time Yaśodharā to conceive a child, a boy named Rahula born on the day Siddhartha left the palace. Thereafter, since the departure of Siddhartha, Yaśodharā entered monastic life in the palace, wearing yellow colored robes and fasting just as Siddhartha did. On the day Siddhartha returned Kapilavastu as Gautama Buddha to see his relatives, Yaśodharā met him after many years. King Suddodana described to the Buddha how Yaśodharā had spent her life without Siddhartha. Buddha at that moment told the jathaka of "Sanda kinduruda " (Story of early life of Yaśodharā ) and how she devoted to him with great respect in previous lives.

After five years when Gautama Buddha gave permission of women entering to sangha she too became a bhikkhuni and attained arhat.

== Rāhula ==
Rāhula (Pāli and Sanskrit) was the only son of Siddhārtha Gautama, and his wife and princess Yaśodharā. He is mentioned in numerous Buddhist texts, from the early period onward. Accounts about Rāhula indicate a mutual impact between Prince Siddhārtha's life and those of his family members. According to the Pāli tradition, Rāhula is born on the day of Prince Siddhārta's renunciation, and is therefore named Rāhula, meaning a fetter on the path to enlightenment. According to the Mūlasarvāstivāda tradition, and numerous other later sources, however, Rāhula is only conceived on the day of Prince Siddhārtha, and is born six years later, when Prince Siddhārtha becomes enlightened as the Buddha. This long gestation period is explained by bad karma from previous lives of both Yaśodharā and of Rāhula himself, although more naturalistic reasons are also given. As a result of the late birth, Yaśodharā needs to prove that Rāhula is really Prince Siddhārtha's son, which she eventually does successfully by an act of truth. Historian Wolfgang Schumann has argued that Prince Siddhārtha conceived Rāhula and waited for his birth, to be able to leave the palace with the king and queen's permission, but Orientalist Noël Péri considered it more likely that Rāhula was born after Prince Siddhārtha left his palace.

Between seven and fifteen years after Rāhula is born, the Buddha returns to Kapilavastu, where Yaśodharā has Rāhula ask the Buddha for the throne of the Śākya clan. The Buddha responds by having Rāhula ordain as the first Buddhist novice monk. He teaches the young novice about truth, self-reflection, and not-self, eventually leading to Rāhula's enlightenment. Although early accounts state that Rāhula dies before the Buddha does, later tradition has it that Rāhula is one of the disciples that outlives the Buddha, guarding the Buddha's Dispensation until the rising of the next Buddha. Rāhula is known in Buddhist texts for his eagerness for learning, and was honored by novice monks and nuns throughout Buddhist history. His accounts have led to a perspective in Buddhism of seeing children as hindrances to the spiritual life on the one hand, and as people with potential for enlightenment on the other hand.

== Maha Pajapati Gotami ==
Maha Pajapati Gotami (Sanskrit: Mahāprajāpatī Gotamī) was the youngest daughter of King Añjana and Queen Sulakkhana. She was married to King Suddhodana with her elder sister Mahamaya (or Mayadevi). When her sister died after the birth of Siddartha Gautama, she took Siddartha into her care. She also had a daughter and a son respectively, Sundari Nanda and Nanda with King Suddodhana.

After the death of King Suddhodana, Maha Prajapati journeyed to find the Buddha. When she found him, she petitioned the Buddha, through Ananda, to allow women to enter the Sangha as bhikkhuni. After many refusals due to their safety sake, the Buddha finally agreed to allow women to enter the Sangha. Later Maha Pajapati became Arhat.

== Sundari Nanda ==
Sundari Nanda was the half sister of Buddha. She was the daughter of king Suddhodana and Maha Pajapati Gotami. She was considered to known as Rupa Nanda and Janapada Kalyani, because of her beauty. She later became a bhikkhuni and became an arhat. Also Buddha honored her as foremost among female disciples excellent in jhana.

== Nanda ==
Nanda was the half-brother of the Buddha; the son of King Suddhodana and Maha Prajapati Gautami. Nanda persevered and became an Arahant.

== Ananda ==
Ānanda was the primary attendant of the Buddha and one of his ten principal disciples. Among the Buddha's many disciples, Ānanda stood out for having the best memory. Most of the texts of the early Buddhist Sutta-Piṭaka (Pāli; Sanskrit: Sūtra-Piṭaka) are attributed to his recollection of the Buddha's teachings during the First Buddhist Council. For that reason, he is known as the "Treasurer of the Dhamma", with Dhamma (Sanskrit: Dharma) referring to the Buddha's teaching. In Early Buddhist Texts, Ānanda is the first cousin of the Buddha. Although the texts do not agree on most things about Ānanda's early life, they do agree that Ānanda is ordained as a monk and that Puṇṇa Mantāniputta (Sanskrit: Pūrṇa Maitrāyaṇīputra) becomes his teacher. After twenty years in the Buddha's ministry, Ānanda becomes the attendant of the Buddha, when the Buddha selects him for this job. Ānanda performs his duties with great devotion and care, and acts as an intermediary between the Buddha and the laypeople, as well as the Saṅgha (monastic community). He accompanies the Buddha for the rest of his life, acting not only as an assistant, but also a secretary and a mouthpiece.

Scholars are skeptical about the historicity of many events in Ānanda's life, especially the First Council, and consensus about this has yet to be established. A traditional account can be drawn from early texts, commentaries, and post-canonical chronicles. Ānanda has an important role in establishing the order of bhikkhunis, when he requests the Buddha on behalf of the latter's foster-mother Mahāpajāpati Gotamī (Sanskrit: Mahāprajāpatī Gautamī) to allow her to be ordained. Ānanda also accompanies the Buddha in the last year of his life, and therefore is witness to many tenets and principles that the Buddha conveys and establishes before his death, including the well-known principle that the Buddhist community should take his teaching and discipline as their refuge, and that the Buddha will not appoint a new leader. The final period of the Buddha's life also shows that Ānanda is still very much attached to the Buddha's person, and he witnesses the Buddha's passing with great sorrow.

Shortly after the Buddha's death, the First Council is convened, and Ānanda manages to attain enlightenment just before the council starts, which is a requirement. He has a historical role during the council as the living memory of the Buddha, reciting many of the Buddha's discourses and checking them for accuracy. During the same council, however, he is chastised by Mahākassapa (Sanskrit: Mahākāśyapa) and the rest of the Saṅgha for allowing women to be ordained and failing to understand or respect the Buddha at several crucial moments. Ānanda continues to teach until the end of his life, passing on his spiritual heritage to his pupils Sāṇavāsī (Sanskrit: Śāṇakavāsī) and Majjhantika (Sanskrit: Madhyāntika), among others, who later assume a leading role in the Second and Third Councils. Ānanda dies in 463 BCE, and stūpas (monuments) are erected at the river where he dies.

Ānanda is one of the most loved figures in Buddhism. Ānanda is known for his memory, erudition and compassion, and is often praised by the Buddha for these matters. He functions as a foil to the Buddha, however, in that he still has worldly attachments and is not yet enlightened, as opposed to the Buddha. In the Sanskrit textual traditions, Ānanda is widely considered the patriarch of the Dhamma, who stands in a spiritual lineage, receiving the teaching from Mahākassapa and passing them on to his own pupils. Ānanda has been honored by bhikkhunis since early medieval times for his merits in establishing the nun's order. In recent times, the composer Richard Wagner wrote a draft for a libretto about Ānanda, which was made into the opera Wagner Dream by Jonathan Harvey in 2007.

== Devadatta ==
Devadatta was the Paternal second cousin (or, in some accounts, paternal second cousin) of the Buddha and the younger brother of Anand. He was ordained into the sangha along with his brothers and friends and their barber, Upāli, when the Buddha preached to the Shakyas in Kapilavastu.

For a time, Devadatta was highly respected among the sangha. Sariputta is said to have sung the praises of Devadatta in Rajagaha. After some time, Devadatta developed siddhis and his intention is said to have been corrupted. After gaining these siddhis, Devadatta attempted to murder the Buddha on several occasions, commonly thought to be motivated by jealousy of the Buddha's power. He is reported to have rolled a boulder toward the Buddha, injured his foot, and to have incited an elephant to charge at the Buddha and his disciples but was subdued by the Buddha.

Devadatta then attempted to split the sangha into two, with one faction led by himself and the other by the Buddha. However, this attempt failed as all of his converts returned to the Buddha's sangha.

Devadatta was reputedly remorseful toward the Buddha at later stage of his life. He is reported to have walked to the monastery where the Buddha was staying to seek for forgiveness but, as a result of bad deeds, he was swallowed up into the earth and reborn in Avici before he could ask for forgiveness.

== See also ==
- Relics associated with Buddha
- Ten principal disciples
- Rohini (Gautama Buddha's cousin and disciple)

== Sources ==
- Buswell, Robert E. Jr.; Lopez, Donald S. Jr. (2013), Princeton Dictionary of Buddhism. (PDF), Princeton University Press, ISBN 978-0-691-15786-3
- Crosby, Kate (2013), "The Inheritance of Rāhula: Abandoned Child, Boy Monk, Ideal Son and Trainee", in Sasson, Vanessa R. (ed.), Little Buddhas: Children and Childhoods in Buddhist Texts and Traditions, Oxford University Press, pp. 97–123, ISBN 978-0-19-994561-0
- Keown, Damien (2004), A Dictionary of Buddhism, Oxford University Press, ISBN 978-0-19-157917-2
- Malalasekera, G.P. (1960), Dictionary of Pāli Proper Names, Pali Text Society, OCLC 793535195
- Meeks, Lori (27 June 2016), "Imagining Rāhula in Medieval Japan" (PDF), Japanese Journal of Religious Studies, 43 (1): 131–51, doi:10.18874/jjrs.43.1.2016.131-151
- Nakagawa, Yoshiharu (2005), "The Child as Compassionate Bodhisattva and as Human Sufferer/Spiritual Seeker: Intertwined Buddhist Images", in Yust, Karen-Marie; Johnson, Aostre N.; Sasso, Sandy Eisenberg; Roehlkepartain, Eugene C. (eds.), Nurturing Child and Adolescent Spirituality: Perspectives from the World's Religious Traditions, Rowman & Littlefield Publishers, pp. 33–42, ISBN 978-1-4616-6590-8
- Péri, Nöel (1918), "Les femmes de Çākya-Muni" [The Wives of Śākyamunī], Bulletin de l'École française d'Extrême-Orient (in French), 18 (1): 1–37, doi:10.3406/befeo.1918.5886
- Saddhasena, D. (2003), "Rāhula", in Malalasekera, G. P.; Weeraratne, W. G. (eds.), Encyclopaedia of Buddhism, vol. 7, Government of Sri Lanka, OCLC 2863845613
- Strong, John S. (1997), "A Family Quest: The Buddha, Yaśodharā, and Rāhula in the Mūlasarvāstivāda Vinaya", in Schober, Juliane (ed.), Sacred Biography in the Buddhist Traditions of South and Southeast Asia, pp. 113–28, ISBN 9780824816995
- Witanachchi, C. (1965), "Ānanda", in Malalasekera, G. P.; Weeraratne, W. G. (eds.), Encyclopaedia of Buddhism, vol. 1, Government of Sri Lanka, OCLC 2863845613
- Schumann, H.W. (2004) [1982], Der Historische Buddha [The historical Buddha: the times, life, and teachings of the founder of Buddhism] (in German), translated by Walshe, M. O' C., Delhi: Motilal Banarsidass, ISBN 81-208-1817-2
