= Rāhula =

Only son of the Buddha

The Elder Rāhula
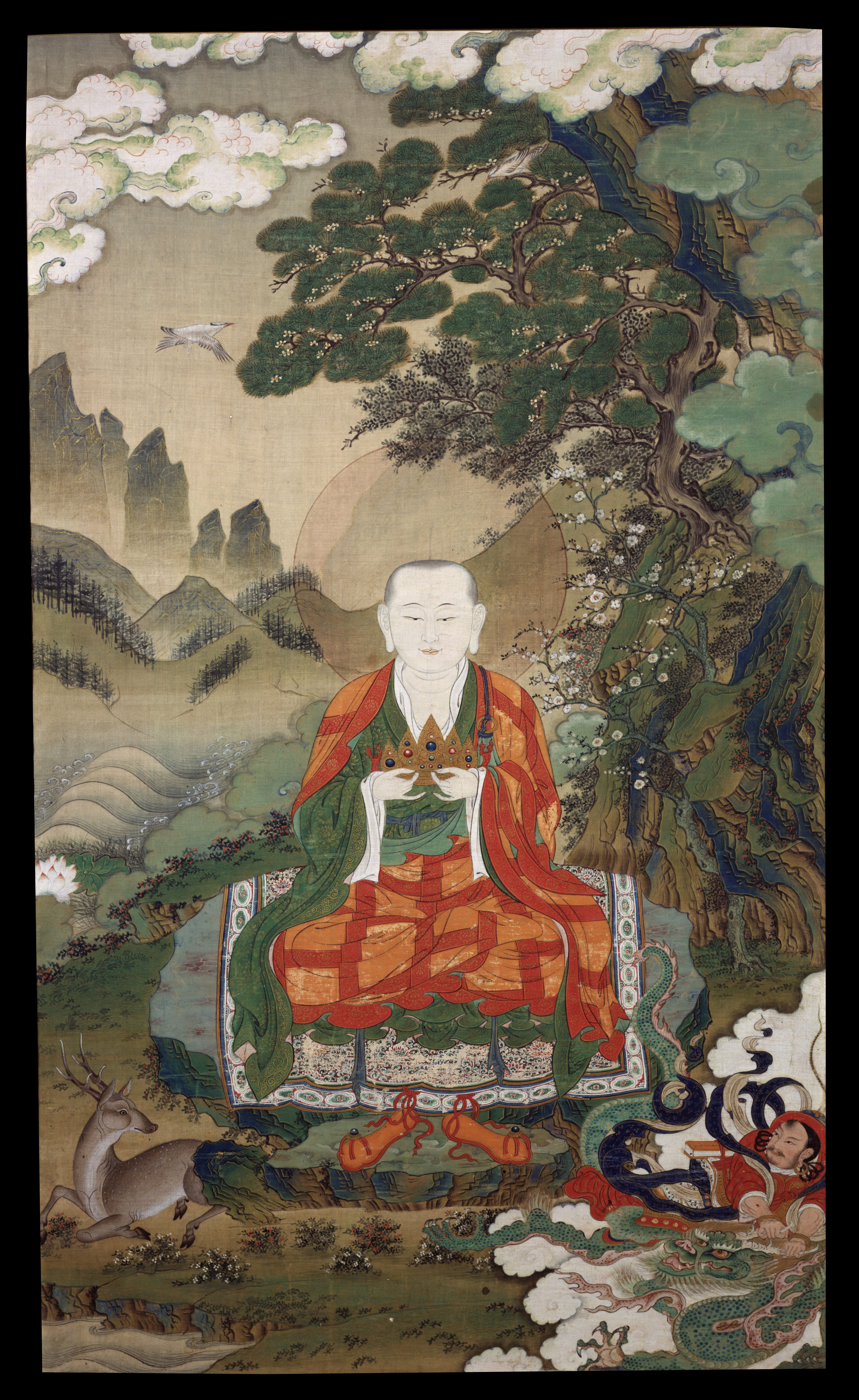
- Rāhula on a Tibetan painting, 16th century
- Title: Patriarch of the Dharma (East Asian Buddhism)

Personal life
- Born: c. 534 BCE or 451 BCE Kapilavastu
- Died: Sources differ
- Parent(s): Prince Siddhārtha (father), Princess Yaśodharā (mother)
- Known for: 1. Pali: sikkhākāmanaṃ, lit. 'Eagerness for learning'; 2. pinyin: mixing diyi; lit. 'Practicing with discretion'
- Other names: 1. Pali: Rāhula-bhadda, lit. 'Rāhula the Lucky', Sanskrit: Rāhula-bhadra; 2. Chinese: 長子; Japanese pronunciation: chōshi; lit. 'The Eldest Child'
- Relatives: Śuddhodana (grand father) Queen Māyā (grand mother); Suppabuddha (grand father) Amita (grand mother); Queen Mahāprajāpatī Gautamī (grand aunt); Sundarī Nandā (aunt); Nanda (uncle)

Religious life
- Religion: Buddhism
- Initiation: 7–15 years in the Buddha's ministry Park of Nigrodha by Śāriputra

Senior posting
- Teacher: Gautama Buddha, the Elder Śariputra
- Predecessor: Āryadeva
- Successor: Sanghānandi

Rāhula (born c. 534 BCE or 451 BCE) was the only son of Siddhārtha Gautama, commonly known as the Buddha, and his wife, princess Yaśodharā. He is mentioned in numerous Buddhist texts, from the early period onward. Accounts about Rāhula indicate a mutual impact between Prince Siddhārtha's life and the lives of his family members.

According to the Pāli tradition, Rāhula was born on the day of Prince Siddhārtha's renunciation, and was therefore named Rāhula, meaning a fetter on the path to enlightenment.

According to the Mūlasarvāstivāda tradition, however, Rāhula was only conceived on the day of Prince Siddhartha's renunciation, and was born six years later, when Prince Siddhārtha became enlightened as the Buddha. This long gestation period was explained by bad karma from previous lives of both Yaśodharā and of Rāhula himself, although more naturalistic reasons are also given. As a result of the late birth, Yaśodharā needed to prove that Rāhula was really Prince Siddhārtha's son, which she eventually did successfully by an act of truth.

Historian H.W. Schumann has argued that Prince Siddhārtha likely conceived Rāhula and waited for his birth, to be able to leave the palace with the king and queen's permission (having produced a Crown Heir as necessary for succession).

However, Orientalist Noël Péri considered it more likely that Rāhula was born after Prince Siddhārtha left his palace.

12 years after Rahula's birth, the Buddha returned to his hometown, where Yaśodharā had Rāhula ask the Buddha for the throne of the Śākya clan. The Buddha responded by having Rāhula ordained as the first Buddhist novice monk. He taught the young novice about truth, self-reflection, and not-self, eventually leading to Rāhula's enlightenment. Although early accounts state that Rāhula died before the Buddha did, later tradition has it that Rāhula was one of the disciples that outlived the Buddha, guarding the Buddha's Dispensation until the rising of the next Buddha. Rāhula is known in Buddhist texts for his eagerness for learning, and was honored by novice monks and nuns throughout Buddhist history. His accounts have led to a perspective in Buddhism of seeing children as hindrances to the spiritual life on the one hand, and as people with potential for enlightenment on the other hand.

== Accounts ==
Some early texts such as those of the Pāli tradition do not mention Rāhula at all; but he is mentioned in later Pāli texts such as the Apadāna and the commentaries, as well as in the texts on monastic discipline of the Mūlasarvāstivāda and Mahāsaṇghika traditions. (Note: For the Apadāna, see Crosby (2013, p. 105). The other information is mentioned in Meeks (2016, p. 139).) Earliest texts do not describe Rāhula in much detail, and he remains an ideal figure without much depth in character. Because of the lack of detail, especially after Rāhula's ordination, some scholars have argued Rāhula did not have an important role in Buddhism. Apart from the early texts, there are many post-canonical Buddhist texts that contain accounts about Rāhula. The accounts about Rāhula reveal that when Prince Siddhārtha left his palace to become a monk; his decision and subsequent spiritual quest was not just a personal matter, but also affected his family every step during the way, as they responded to and affected the prince on his path to enlightenment. Thus, the prince's life before enlightenment is about two parallel spiritual lives, that of the Buddha and that of his family.

=== Birth ===
==== Pāli tradition ====
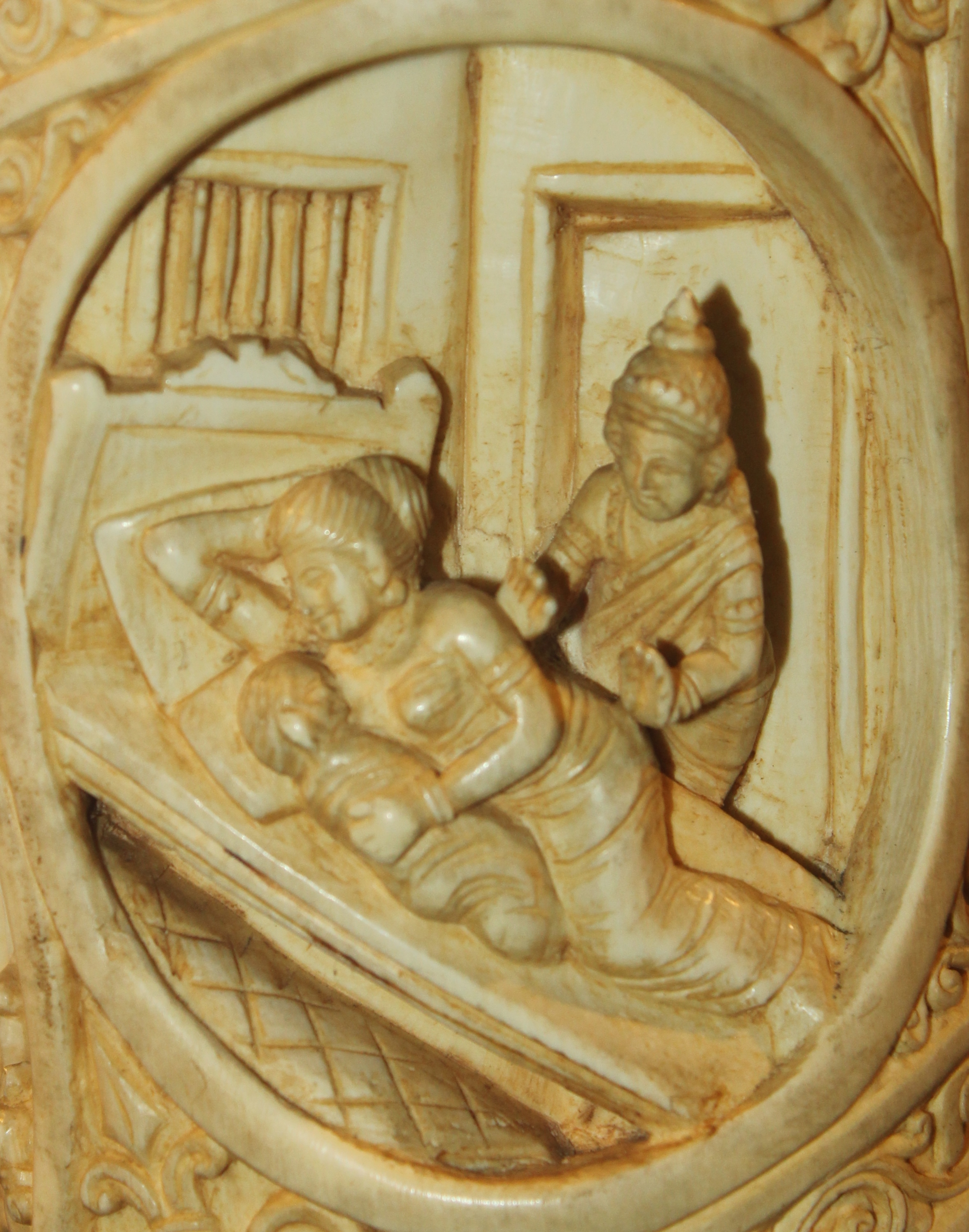
Just before the prince leaves the palace for the spiritual life, he takes one look at his wife Yaśodharā and his just-born child. 7 years after attaining Buddhahood the Buddha visited Kapilawastupura again on the behalf of Minister Kaludaiy

Rāhula was born on the same day Prince Siddhārtha Gautama renounced the throne by leaving the palace, when the prince was 29 years old, (Note: According to some traditional sources, the prince is sixteen then. Furthermore, some sources say that Rāhula is born seven days before Prince Siddhārtha leaves the palace.) on the full moon day of the eighth lunar month of the ancient Indian calendar. That day, Prince Siddhārtha was preparing himself to leave the palace. The Pāli account claims that when he received the news of his son's birth he replied "rāhulajāto bandhanaṃ jātaṃ", meaning "A rāhu is born, a fetter has arisen", that is, an impediment to the search for enlightenment. Accordingly, Śuddhodana, Prince Siddhārtha's father and king of the Śākya clan, named the child Rāhula, because he did not want his son to pursue a spiritual life as a mendicant. In some versions, Prince Siddhārtha was the one naming his son this way, for being a hindrance on his spiritual path. Just before the prince left the palace for the spiritual life, he took one look at his wife Yaśodharā and his just-born child. Fearing his resolve might waver, Prince Siddhārtha resisted to hold his son and left the palace as he had planned. Rāhula therefore became Prince Siddhārtha's first and only son.

==== Other traditions ====
Other texts derive rāhu differently. For example, the Pāli Apadāna, as well as another account found in the texts of monastic discipline of the Mūlasarvāstivāda tradition, derive rāhu from the eclipse of the moon, which traditionally was seen to be caused by the asura (demon) Rāhu. The Apadāna states that just like the moon is obstructed from view by Rāhu, Prince Siddhārtha was obstructed by Rāhula's birth. The Mūlasarvāstivāda tradition relates, however, that Rāhula was conceived on the evening of the renunciation of Prince Siddhārtha, and born six years later, on the day that his father achieved enlightenment, which was during a lunar eclipse. Further credence is given to the astrological theory of Rāhula's name by the observation that sons of previous Buddhas were given similar names, related to constellations.

Mūlasarvāstivāda and later Chinese texts such as the Abhiniṣkramaṇa Sūtra give two types of explanation for the long gestation period. The first type involves the karma of Princess Yaśodharā and Rāhula himself. According to this interpretation, Yaśodharā had to bear the suffering of carrying a child in her womb for six years, because in a previous life as a cow herder she had refused to help her mother to carry a pail of milk and left it for her mother to carry the extra pail for six leagues. As for Rāhula, his karma was that in a previous life as a king he unintentionally had a sage wait for six days. In this life, he was a king called Sūrya and his brother, a previous life of the Buddha, was a hermit called Candra or Likhita who had taken a vow he would only live from what was given by people. One day, the brother broke his vow to take some water, and feeling guilty, asked the king to punish him. (Note: In the texts of the Mūlasarvāstivāda tradition, the brother is another hermit, not the king, but he sends his brother to see the king for punishment.) The king refused to issue a punishment for such a trivial matter, but had his brother wait for his final decision and constrained in the royal gardens. After six days, the king suddenly realized he had forgotten about the hermit and immediately set him free, including apologies and gifts. As a result, Rāhula had to wait for six years before being born. (Note: See Sasson & Law (2008, p. 69) and Strong (1997, p. 117). For the names of the two brothers, see Deeg (2010, pp. 59, 62).) In some versions, the king did not allow a sage to enter his kingdom and accumulated the same bad karma of a long gestation period. The later Mahāyāna commentary Mahāprajñāpāramitāupadeśa (Chinese: 大智度論; pinyin: Dazhidulun) does not blame Yaśodharā's karma for the six years gestation period, but does mention Rāhula's same karma as a king. However, in the 13th-century Japanese devotional text Raun Kōshiki, Rāhula's late birth is seen as evidence of a miracle, rather than a result of karma. (Note: In the Pāli texts, no long gestation period of Rāhula is mentioned, but a similar motif occurs in the story of Suppāvāsā, with a similar karma in a past life.)

The second type of explanation consists of the more naturalistic argument that Yaśodharā was practicing religious austerities involving fasting and sleeping on a straw bed, which caused Rāhula's growth to slow down. She was involved in these practices during the time when Siddhārtha was practicing self-mortification. Later, King Śuddhodana prevented Yaśodharā from hearing any news of her former husband, and she gradually became healthier, as the pregnancy continued normally. However, some time later, the false rumor spread that the former prince had died of his ascetism. Yaśodharā became very desperate and depressed, endangering her own pregnancy. When the news reached the palace that Siddhārtha had attained enlightenment, Yaśodharā was overjoyed and gave birth to Rāhula. Buddhist Studies scholar John S. Strong notes that this account draws a parallel between the quest for enlightenment and Yaśodharā's path to being a mother, and eventually, they both are accomplished at the same time.

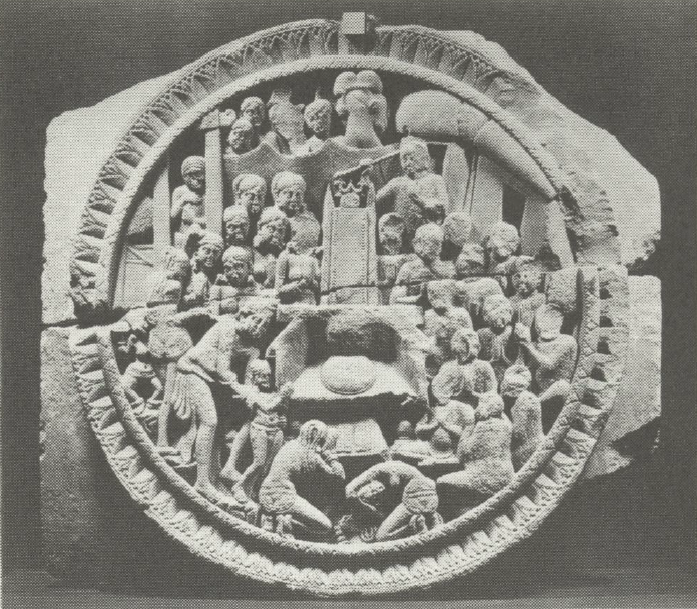
The Buddha returning home following his enlightenment, being greeted by Rāhula. The Buddha is represented by his footprints and throne. Amarāvatī, 3rd century. National Museum, New Delhi.

The late childbirth leads to doubts in the Śākya clan as to who is the father, as told in the Mūlasarvāstivāda tradition, in the Mahāprajñāpāramitāupadeśa and in the later Chinese Zabaozang jing (Chinese: 雜寶藏經). Since Rāhula's birth was not regarded by Buddhists to be a virginal or miraculous birth, tradition had to explain that Prince Siddhārtha was actually the father. Yaśodharā responded by putting her child on a stone in a pond of water and making an act of truth that if Rāhula really was his child, that Rāhula and the stone may not sink, but rather float back-and-forth. After she made the declaration, the child floated according to her vow. Strong notes that this is a symbolic parallel with the attainment of enlightenment by the Buddha—described as the "further shore"—and the return to teach humankind. The Mahāprajñāpāramitāupadeśa contains another account, in which Prince Siddhārtha has several wives, and a wife other than Yaśodharā is the one defending her, being witness of her purity in conduct.

Furthermore, in both the Mūlasarvāstivāda texts and the Mahāprajñāpāramitāupadeśa, there is a third account that proves Yaśodharā's purity in conduct: in this version, the Buddha made everyone around him look identical to him, through a supernatural accomplishment. Rāhula proved that the Buddha was his true father when he managed to approach the real Buddha straight away. (Note: Yaśodharā had Rāhula present a gift to his real father, and he manages to find him straight away. In one version of the story the gift is a ring signet, in another version it is an aphrodisiac. (See § Ordination, below.)) In a fourth story about proving Yaśodhara's purity, appearing in Chinese Avadāna-style texts from the 5th century CE onward, she was burnt alive, but miraculously survived. In this account, King Śuddhodana ordered that she be killed by burning her alive as punishment for her alleged impurity. Instead of being hurt by the flames, however, she performed an act of truth and the fire transformed into a pond of water. Śuddhodana welcomed her and her son back into the clan, and later became very fond of Rāhula. Some Chinese Jātakas say that he recognized his son Siddhārtha in the child, and managed to better cope with the loss of Prince Siddhārtha. Religion scholar Reiko Ohnuma sees the fire ordeal as a metaphor that parallels the Buddha's enlightenment, a similar argument that Strong makes.

==== Scholarly analysis ====
Historians Mircea Eliade and H.W. Schumann hypothesized that Prince Siddhārtha conceived Rāhula to please his parents, to obtain their permission for leaving the palace and becoming a mendicant. It was an Indian custom to renounce the world only after the birth of a child or grandchild. Schumann further speculated that the prince only conceived a son thirteen years after his marriage, because Yaśodharā initially did not want to bear a child, for fear that the prince would leave the palace and the throne as soon as the child was conceived. Orientalist Noël Péri believed, however, that a late gestation period was more historically probable than the birth on the same day, as in the Pāli tradition. He believed that if Prince Siddhārtha had left an heir to the throne, there would have been no sound reason for him to leave secretly at night. In many traditional biographies, Prince Siddhārtha is described leaving the palace without his parents' permission. Péri argued that this makes little sense if he had already provided an heir to his parents' satisfaction. He further argued that there are many sources that try to explain the long gestation period, indicating an established tradition. Nevertheless, although many traditional accounts of the Buddha's life relate that Siddhartha leaves the palace in secret, Early Buddhist Texts clearly state that his parents are aware of his choice, as they are said to weep at the time their son leaves them.

From a mythological and text critical point of view, Buddhist Studies scholar Kate Crosby argues that Prince Siddhārtha conceiving or giving birth to a son before his renunciation functions as a motif to prove that he was the best at each possible path in life: after having tried the life of a father to the fullest, he decided to leave it behind for a better alternative. In early Buddhist India, being a father and bearing a son was seen as a spiritual and religious path as well as that of renouncing one's family, and Prince Siddhārtha's bringing a son in the world before renunciation proves he was capable of both. Buddhist studies scholar John S. Strong hypothesizes that the Mūlasarvāstivāda version of the story of the prince conceiving a child on the eve of his departure was developed to prove that the Buddha was not physically disabled in some way. A disability might have raised doubts about the validity of his ordination in monastic tradition.

=== Ordination ===
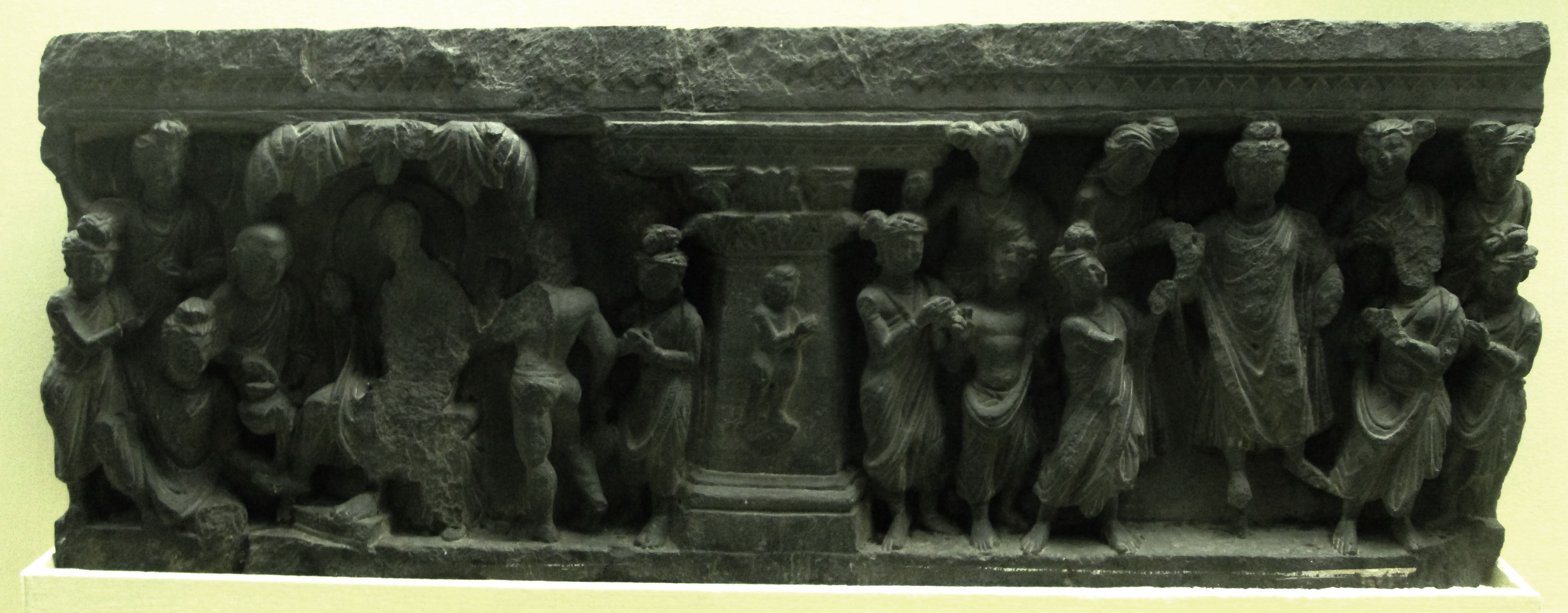
Ordination of Rāhula, Indian Museum, Kolkata

The accounts continue and describe that Rāhula was raised by his mother Yaśodharā and grandfather King Śuddhodana. When Rāhula was between seven and fifteen years old, (Note: Different texts refer to different ages. For seven years, see Saddhasena (2003, p. 481); for nine years, see Meeks (2016, p. 136) and Schumann (2004, p. 123); for fifteen years, see Crosby (2013, p. 110).) the Buddha returned to his home city of Kapilavastu at the request of Śuddhodana. The Mahāvastu text from the Lokottaravāda tradition states that the royals tried to prevent Rāhula from learning about the return of his father, but eventually he insisted to know who the "Great Ascetic" about to arrive was, and he was told. (Note: Indologist Bhikkhu Telwatte Rahula argues that the child was conscious of being without a father.) Next, the Mahāvastu and the Mūlasarvāstivāda texts relate that Yaśodharā tried to tempt the Buddha back into his life as a prince by having Rāhula offer the Buddha an aphrodisiac. Mūlasarvāstivāda texts continue and tell that her plan backfired when the Buddha had Rāhula eat it himself, and Rāhula therefore became enamored by his father and wished to follow him. In the Pāli version of the story, on the seventh day of the Buddha's return, Yaśodharā took Rāhula to see his father, the Buddha. She told Rāhula that since his father had renounced the palace life and as he was the next royal prince in line, he should ask his father for his inheritance of crown and treasure. This would be for his future sake when his grandfather would no longer rule the kingdom. After the Buddha had a meal, Rāhula followed the Buddha and asked him for his inheritance. The Buddha did not try to prevent Rāhula from following him, but in some versions of the story, some women from the court did try to, yet Rāhula persisted. He then looked at his father and says, "Pleasant is your shadow, recluse". After Rāhula reached the Park of Nigrodha, where the Buddha was staying, the Buddha considered that the heritage of the throne would one day perish, and was tied up with suffering and stress: "I will give him the wealth I obtained under the tree of enlightenment thus making him the heir of an inheritance that does not perish."

"The Prince Rāhula
When he was nine years old
Went forth from the home life
To cultivate the Eightfold Path.
Let us take refuge in and pay highest homage to Venerable Rāhula, who was born and went forth in order to benefit sentient beings."

— cited in Sekiguchi (1998, p. 16), translated by Meeks (2016, p. 144), Raun Kōshiki

Most traditions relate that the Buddha then called Śāriputra and asked him to ordain Rāhula. Rāhula was ordained, becoming the first śrāmaṇera (novice monk), and probably the first person in the monastic order to receive ordination in a formal way. In some versions of the story, such as the 9th-century Chinese Weicengyou Yinyuan Jing (Chinese: 未曾有因緣經), a group of young boys were ordained together with him. The king discovered that his grandson, his son Nanda and a number of other young men in the royal family had then received ordination and left the palace. Seeing his daughter grieve, he asked the Buddha that from now on, he only ordain people with the consent of their parents. Śuddhodana explained that Rāhula's ordination was a great shock to him. The Buddha assented to the proposal. This rule was later expanded in the case of women ordaining, as both parents and the husband had to give permission first to allow women to join the order of monks and nuns. In some versions of the story of Rāhula's ordination, Yaśodharā also protested, but relented in the end. The Mahāvastu states, however, that Rāhula asked to ordain himself, and was eventually granted permission by Yaśodharā and Śuddhodana.

Archaeologist Maurizio Taddei has noted that in many Gandhāran art depictions, Rāhula's life is linked to that of a previous life of the Buddha, the hermit Sumedha. The Buddha giving his spiritual heritage to his son is compared to that of Sumedha allowing the Buddha Dīpaṃkara to walk over him, which was followed by Dipaṃkara predicting that Sumedha will become a Buddha in a future life. Both the figure of Gautama Buddha giving his inheritance to his son, and the figure of Dīpaṃkara Buddha giving his inheritance of Buddhahood to Sumedha are depicted with flames emitting from their bodies; both scenes are depictions of inheritance, filial and disciple piety; both may have been considered by 5th-century Buddhists to be representations of "eager youth".

=== Enlightenment and death ===
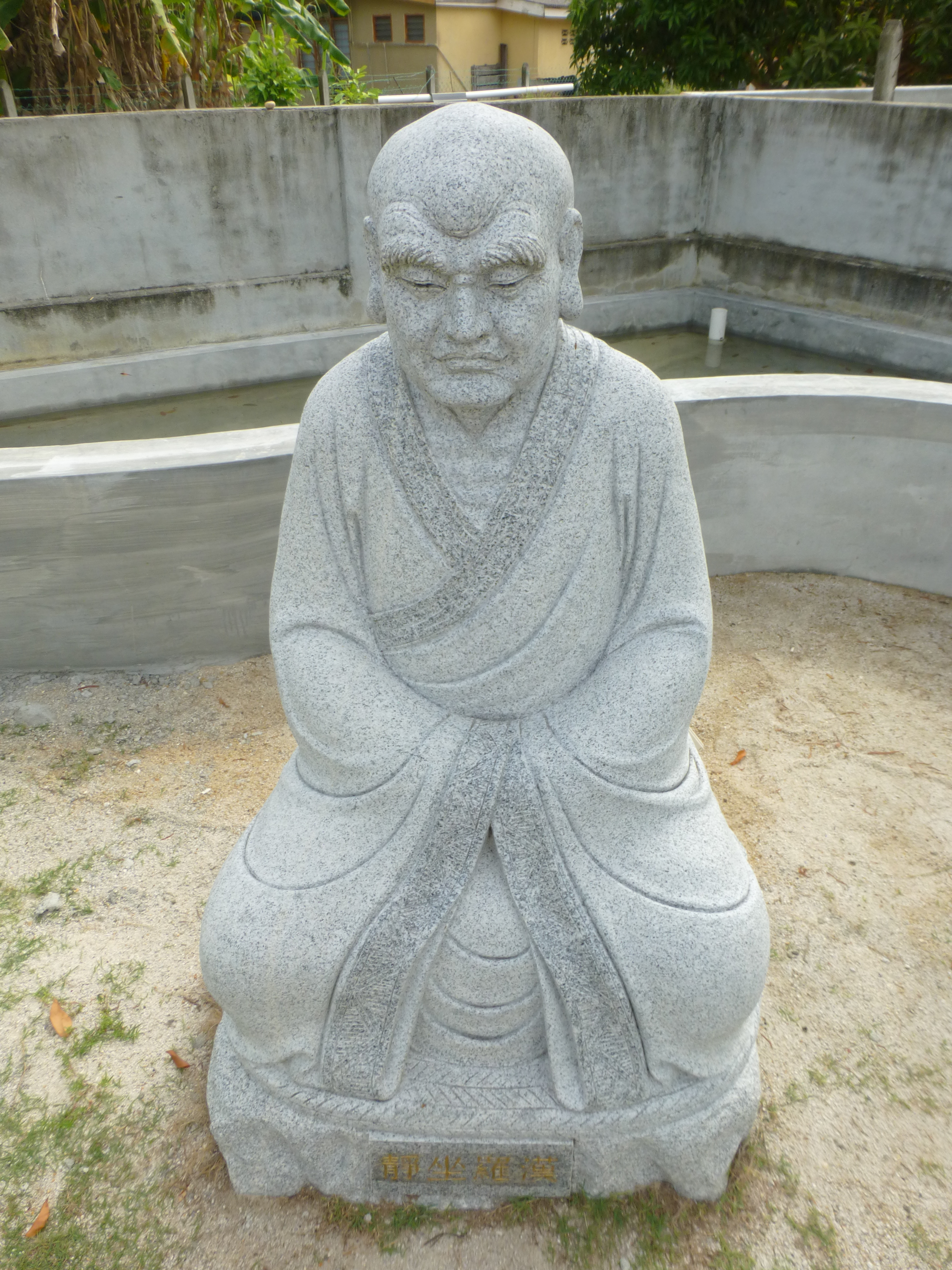
Statue of Rāhula as monk at Ping Sien Si, Pasir Panjang, Perak, Malaysia

According to the Pāli texts, once Rāhula had become novice, the Buddha taught Rāhula regularly. His instructions were very age-specific, using vivid metaphors and simple explanations. The Buddha's teachings have led to numerous discourses being named after Rāhula in the Early Buddhist Texts. Pāli texts relate how Rāhula grew up to become a novice that was diligent, dutiful, amenable and eager for learning, but there are also some early medieval Chinese and Japanese accounts which relate that Rāhula initially struggled with being a novice and only later appreciated the Buddha's teaching. Besides the Buddha, Śāriputra and Maugalyayāna also helped to teach Rāhula. Rāhula often assisted Śāriputra on his rounds for alms in the morning, and sometimes on other travels. (Note: Both Buswell & Lopez (2013, Rāhula) and Malalasekera (1960, Rāhula) mention the alms, but only Malalasekera (1960, Rāhula) mentions the other travels.) Every morning, Rāhula woke up and threw a handful of sand in the air, making the wish that he may be counselled by good teachers as much as those grains of sand.

Still in the same year as Rāhula's ordination, the Buddha taught his son the importance of telling the truth in a discourse known as the Ambalaṭṭhika-Rāhulovāda Sutta. In this discourse, the Buddha taught and encouraged consistent self-reflection, to help let go of all evil actions that lead to harm to oneself and others, and to develop self-control and a moral life. He encouraged reflection before, during and after one's actions, and explained that lying makes the spiritual life void and empty, leading to many other evils.

When Rāhula became eighteen years old, the Buddha instructed Rāhula in a meditation technique to counter the desires that hinder him during his tours for alms. Rāhula had grown enamored with his own and his father's handsome appearance. To help Rāhula, the Buddha taught another discourse to him. He told Rāhula that all matter is not-self, and the same held for the different parts of one's mental experience. (Note: For the part on alms rounds, see Saddhasena (2003, p. 482). For the part about not-self, see Malalasekera (1960, Rāhula) and Crosby (2013, p. 115).) Having heard the discourse, Rāhula started to practice meditation. His teacher Śāriputra recommended him to practice breathing meditation, but was unable to give Rāhula the instructions he needed. Rāhula therefore asked the Buddha to explain the meditation method in more detail and the Buddha responded by describing several meditation techniques to him. On a similar note, the Buddha taught Rāhula at a place called Andhavana about the impermanence of all things, and instructed him how to overcome the "taints" inside the mind. As a result, Rāhula attained enlightenment. Pāli tradition has it that the sermon was also attended by a crore of heavenly beings, who once had vowed to witness the enlightenment of the son of the Buddha. Rāhula obtained the name "Rāhula the Lucky" (Pali: Rāhula-bhadda; Sanskrit: Rāhula-bhadra), which he himself explained was because of being the son of the Buddha, and because of having attained enlightenment. (Note: See Buswell & Lopez (2013, Rāhula) and Malalasekera (1960, Rāhula). For the Sanskrit translation, see Burnouf (2010, p. 489).)

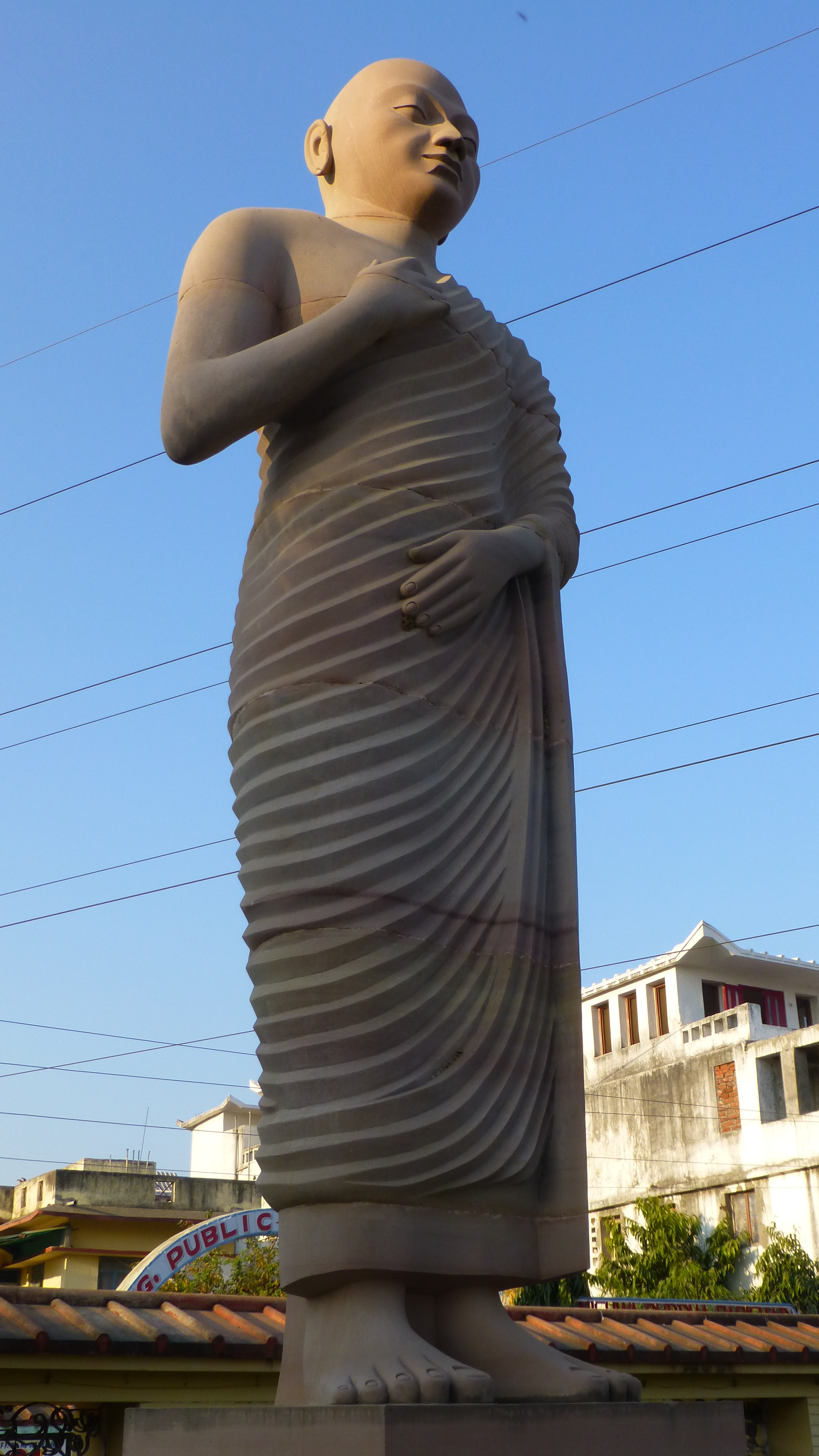
Statue of Rāhula, Bihar, India.

Later, the Buddha declared that Rāhula was foremost among all disciples in eagerness in learning (Pali: sikkhākamānaṃ). and in the Pāli Udāna, the Buddha included him as one of eleven particularly praiseworthy disciples. Chinese sources add that he was also known for his patience, and that he was foremost in 'practicing with discretion' (pinyin: mixing diyi), meaning practicing the Buddha's teaching consistently, dedication to the precepts and study, but without seeking praise or being proud because of being the son of the Buddha. (Note: For the aspect of dedication to the precepts and to study, as well as avoiding being proud, see Irons (2007, p. 163); for the aspect of seeking praise, see Buswell & Lopez (2013, Rāhula).) Pāli texts give examples of Rāhula's strictness in monastic discipline. E.g. after there was a rule established that no novice could sleep in the same room as a fully ordained monk, Rāhula was said to have slept in an outdoor toilet. When the Buddha became aware of this, he admonished the monks for not taking proper care of the novices. After that, the Buddha adjusted the rule.

Pāli texts state that despite Rāhula being his son, the Buddha did not particularly favor him: he is said to have loved problematic disciples such as Aṅgulimāla and Devadatta as much as his own son, without any bias. Schumann writes that the Buddha's relationship with his son was "... trusting and friendly, but not cordial or intimate", in order to prevent attachment in the monastic life. Schumann concludes that the Buddha's discourses to his son were essentially not different in nature from those he gave to his other disciples.

Later in Rāhula's life his mother Yaśodharā became ordained as a nun. In one story, the nun Yaśodharā fell ill with flatulence. Rāhula helped her recover by asking his teacher Śāriputra to find sweetened mango juice for her, which was the medicine she was used to and required. Therefore, with Rāhula's help, she eventually recovered. (Note: See Malalasekera (1960, Rāhulamātā) and Crosby (2013, p. 112). Only Malalasekera mentions the mango juice and the recovery.)

When he was 20 years old, Rāhula fully ordained as a monk in Sāvatthī. (Note: See Baroni (2002, p. 261) and Schumann (2004, p. 123). For the information that he was fully ordained in Sāvatthī, see Sarao (2013, p. 157).)

Rāhula's death receives little attention in the earliest sources. Rāhula died before the Buddha and his teacher Śariputra did. According to Pāli and Chinese sources, this happened as he was travelling psychically through the second Buddhist heaven (Sanskrit: Trāyastriṃśa). According to the early Ekottara Āgama (Sārvastivāda or Mahāsaṅghika tradition) and the later Śāriputrapṛcchā, however, Rāhula was one of the four enlightened disciples whom Gautama Buddha asked to prolong their lives to stay in the world until the next Buddha Maitreya has risen, to protect his dispensation.

=== Previous lives ===
Following the Pāli and Sanskrit language sources, Rāhula was the son of the Buddha-to-be throughout many lifetimes. He developed his habit of being amenable and easy to teach in previous lives. Pāli texts explain that in a previous life he was impressed by the son of a previous Buddha, and vowed to be like him in a future life.

== Legacy ==
Texts in the Mahāyāna tradition describe that Rāhula is the eleventh of the 16 Elders (Sanskrit: Ṣoḍaśasthavira; Chinese tradition added two elders in the 10th century, making for 18 Elders), enlightened disciples that have been entrusted with taking care of the Buddha's dispensation until the rising of Maitreya Buddha. Tradition states therefore that Rāhula will be alive until the next Buddha, and until that time resides with 1,100 of his pupils in an island called the 'land of chestnuts and grains' (Chinese: 畢利颺瞿洲; pinyin: Biliyangqu zhou). (Note: See Buswell & Lopez (2013, Rāhula) and Meeks (2016, pp. 137–8). For the number of 18, see Irons (2007, p. 400); Strong (1997, pp. 121–22). For the information that Biliyangqu zhou is an island, see Dong (2010, p. 59 n.11).) The pilgrim Xuan Zang (c.602–664) heard a brahmin claim that he met Rāhula as an old man, who had delayed his passing into Nirvana and was therefore still alive. On a similar note, Rāhula is considered one of the Ten Principal Disciples, known for his dedication to training new monks and novices. Moreover, he is considered to be one of the 23–28 masters in the lineage of the Tiantai tradition, one of the 28 in the Chan lineage, (Note: Welter (2004, pp. 462–3) says Tiantai has only 23 patriarchs, whereas Irons (2007, p. 526) states they later expanded to 28.) and one of the eight enlightened disciples in the Burmese tradition.

As one of the enlightened disciples responsible for protecting the Buddha's dispensation, Rāhula has often been depicted in East Asian art. He is depicted with a large, "umbrella-shaped" head, prominent eyes and a hooked nose.

The Chinese monks Xuan Zang and Faxian (c.320–420 CE) noted during their pilgrimages in India that a cult existed that worshiped Rāhula, especially in the Madhura area. Whereas monks would worship certain early male disciples following their particular specialization, and nuns would honor Ānanda in gratitude for helping to set up the nuns' order, novices would worship Rāhula. The two Chinese pilgrims noted that Emperor Aśoka built a monument in honor of Rāhula, especially meant for novices to pay their respects. Religious studies scholar Lori Meeks points out with regard to Japan, however, that Rāhula was not the individual object of any devotional cult, but was rather honored as part of a group of enlightened disciples, such as the 16 Elders. Exception to this was the 13th–14th century, when the figure of Rāhula became an important part of a revival of devotion to early Buddhist disciples among the old Nara schools, as chanted lectures (kōshiki) rites, and images were used in dedication to Rāhula. On regular days of religious observance, male and female novices performed rites and gave lectures in honor of Rāhula. These were popular with the laypeople, as well as with priests that aimed to revive Indian Buddhism, in particular early Buddhist monastic discipline. In the kōshiki Rāhula was praised extensively, and was described as the "Eldest Child", eldest being a devotional term, since Prince Siddhārtha had no other children. Thus, the person of Rāhula became an object of devotion and inspiration for monks who wished to observe monastic discipline well.

The Lotus Sūtra, as well as later East Asian texts such as the Raun Kōshiki, relate that Gautama Buddha predicts Rāhula will become a Buddha in a future life, named "Stepping on Seven Treasure Flowers" (Sanskrit: Saptaratnapadmavikrama). In these texts, Rāhula is seen as a Mahāyāna type of Buddha-to-be, who would save many sentient beings and lives in a Pure Land.

The exhortations the Buddha gives to Rāhula have also become part of his legacy. The Ambalaṭṭhika-Rāhulovāda Sutta became one of the seven Buddhist texts recommended for study in the inscriptions of the Emperor Aśoka. This discourse has been raised by modern ethicists as evidence for consequentalist ethics in Buddhism, though this is disputed.

Rāhula is mentioned as one of the founders of a system of Buddhist philosophy called the Vaibhāṣika, which was part of the Sarvāstivāda schools. He is also considered by some Thai schools of Buddhist borān meditation to be the patron of their tradition, which is explained by referring to Rāhula's gradual development in meditation as opposed to the instant enlightenment of other disciples.

=== Childhood in Buddhism ===
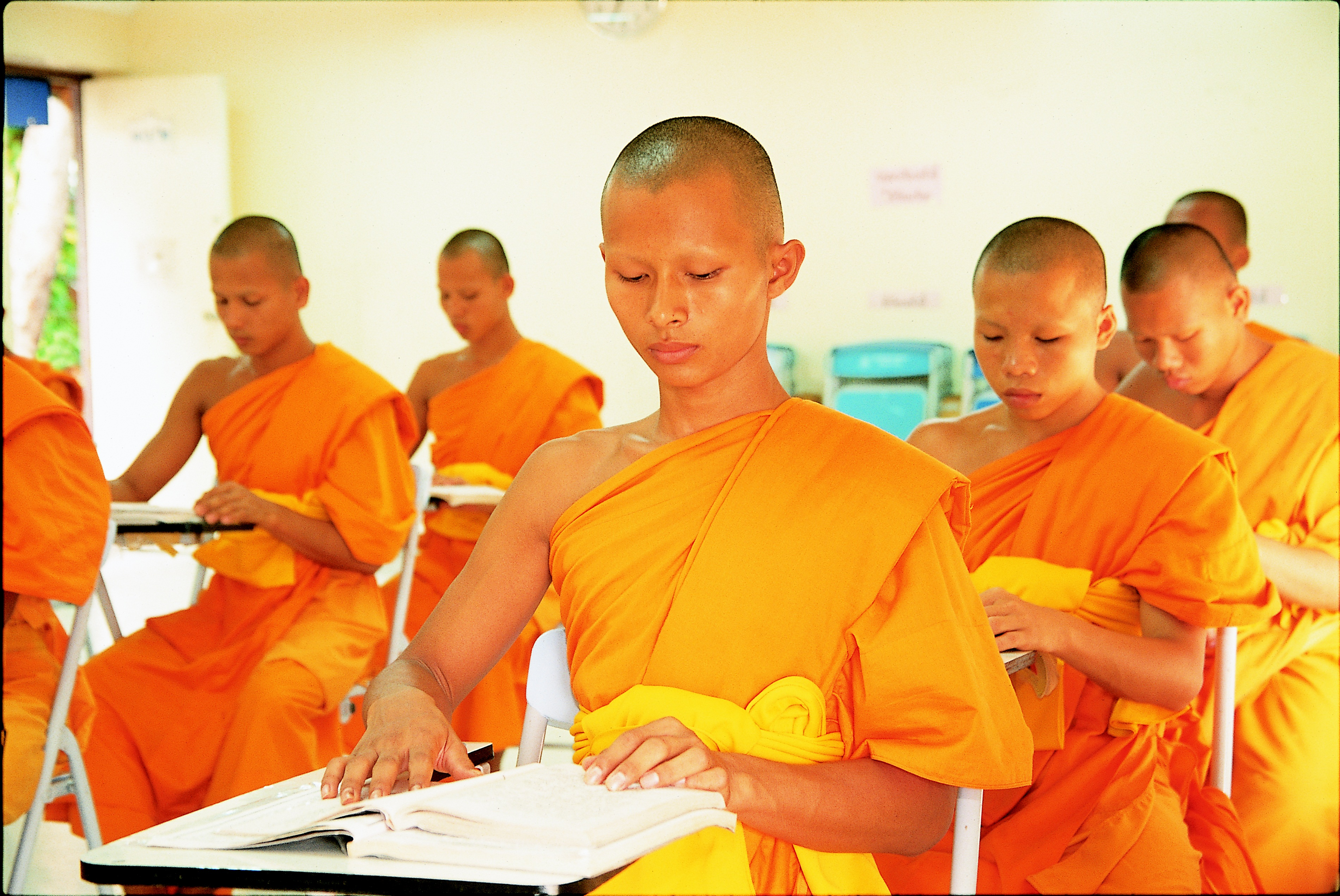
The acceptance of Rāhula in the monastic order as a child set a precedent, which later developed into a widespread Buddhist tradition of educating children in monasteries.

From the narratives surrounding Rāhula several conclusions have been drawn with regard to Buddhist perspectives on childhood. Several scholars have raised Rāhula's example to indicate that children in Buddhism are seen as an obstacle to spiritual enlightenment, or that Buddhism, being a monastic religion, is not interested in children. Education scholar Yoshiharu Nakagawa argues, however, that Rāhula's story points at two ideals of childhood which exist parallel in Buddhism: that of the common child, subject to the human condition, and that of the child with a potential for enlightenment, who Crosby describes as a heroic disciple. Religion scholar Vanessa Sasson notes that although Prince Siddhārtha initially abandons his son, he comes back for him and offers a spiritual heritage to him as opposed to a material one. This heritage is given from a viewpoint of trust in the potential of the child Rāhula, presuming that the Buddhist path can also be accessed by children.

The acceptance of Rāhula in the monastic order as a child set a precedent, which later developed into a widespread Buddhist tradition of educating children in monasteries. The numerous teachings given to Rāhula have left behind teaching material which could be used for teaching children of different ages, and were sophisticated for the time period with regard to their age-specific material. Theravāda tradition further built on this genre, with Pāli manuals of religious teaching for novices. Writing about the Buddha's teachings methods used for Rāhula, psychologist Kishani Townshend argues "... Buddha's use of Socratic questioning, poetic devices and role modelling are still relevant to developing virtue in today's children."

== Notes ==
Buddhist titles
Preceded by Āryadeva	Chan and Zen lineages (According to the Zen schools of China and Japan)	Succeeded by Sanghānandi
