= Ten principal disciples =

Main disciples of Gautama Buddha

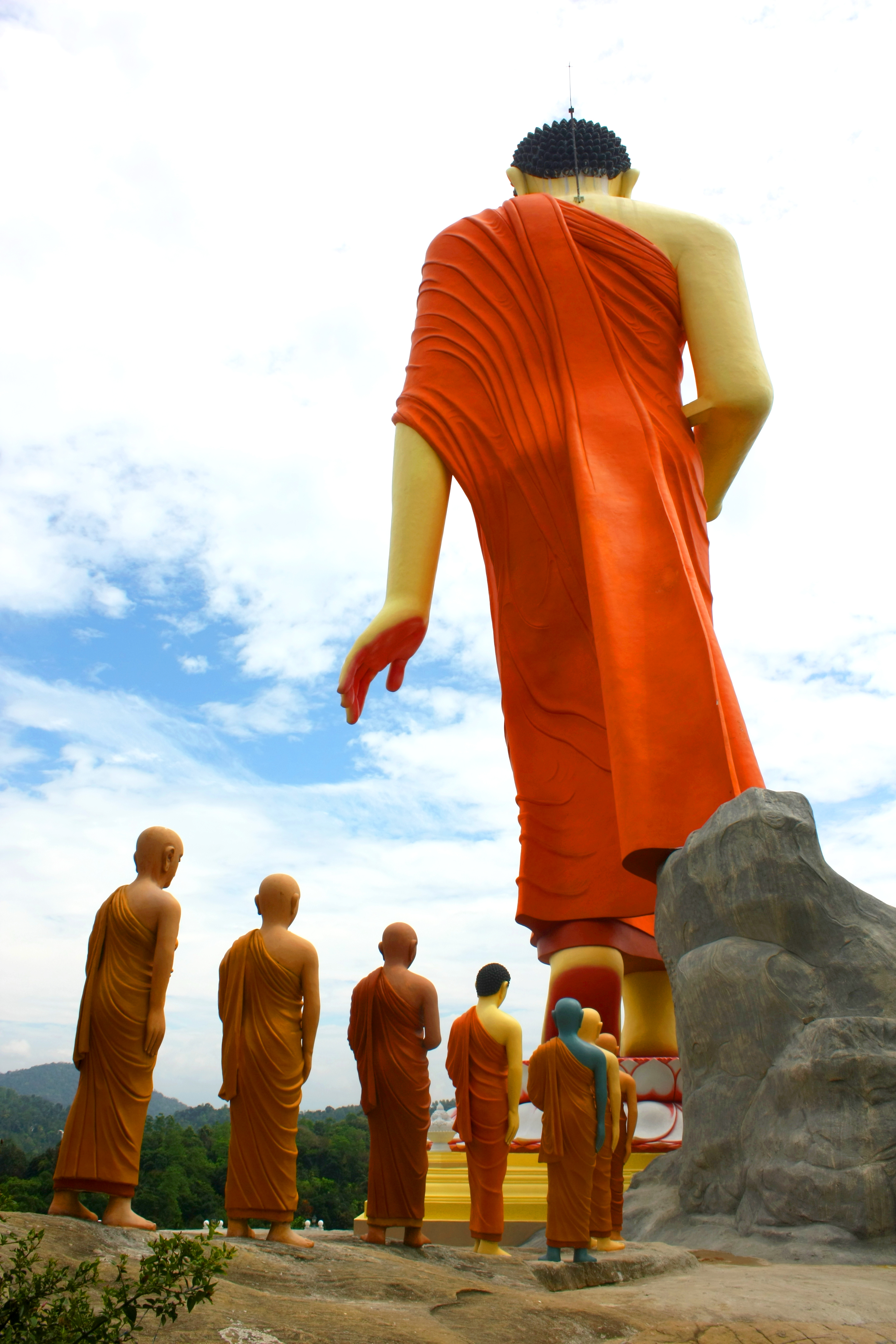
Buddha and his disciples. Kandy, Sri Lanka

The ten principal disciples were the main disciples of Gautama Buddha. Depending on the scripture, the disciples included in this group vary. In many Mahāyāna discourses, these ten disciples are mentioned, but in differing order. The ten disciples can be found as an iconographic group in notable places in the Mogao Caves. They are mentioned in Chinese texts from the fourth century BCE until the twelfth century CE, and are the most honored of the groups of disciples, especially so in China and Central Asia. The ten disciples are mentioned in the Mahāyāna text Vimalakīrti-nideśa, among others. Zhi Dun referred to them as the "Ten Wise Ones" (Chinese: 十哲, romanized: shí zhé), a term normally used for the disciples of Confucius.

== Śāriputra ==
Śāriputra (Sanskrit: शारिपुत्र, romanized: Śāriputra; Tibetan: ཤཱ་རིའི་བུ་, Pali: Sāriputta, Khmer: សិរីបុត្រ) (lit. 'the son of Śāri'); born Upatiṣya (Pali: Upatissa); was one of the top disciples of the Buddha. He is considered the first of the Buddha's two chief disciples, together with Maudgalyāyana (Pali: Moggallāna). Śāriputra had a key leadership role in the ministry of the Buddha and is considered in many Buddhist schools to have been important in the development of the Buddhist Abhidharma. He appears in several Mahayana sutras, and in some sutras, is used as a counterpoint to represent the Hinayana school of Buddhism. For example, the Heart Sutra, widely considered to be of utmost centrality to the Mahayana worldview and practice, is framed as an extended discourse delivered to Śāriputra. The sutra consists of radical reinterpretation of early Buddhist thought in the light of emptiness.

Buddhist texts relate that Śāriputra and Maudgalyāyana were childhood friends who became spiritual wanderers in their youth. After having searched for spiritual truth for a while, they came into contact with the teachings of the Buddha and ordained as monks under him, after which the Buddha declared the friends his two chief disciples. Śāriputra was said to have attained enlightenment as an arhat two weeks after ordaining. As chief disciple Śāriputra assumed a leadership role in the Sangha, doing tasks like looking after monks, giving them objects of meditation, and clarifying points of doctrine. He was the first disciple the Buddha allowed to ordain other monks. Śāriputra died shortly before the Buddha in his hometown and was cremated. According to Buddhist texts, his relics were then enshrined at Jetavana Monastery. Archaeological findings from the 1800s suggest his relics may have been redistributed across the Indian subcontinent by subsequent kings.

Śāriputra is regarded as an important and wise disciple of the Buddha, particularly in Theravada Buddhism where he is given a status close to a second Buddha. In Buddhist art, he is often depicted alongside the Buddha, usually to his right. He was known for his strict adherence to the Buddhist monastic rules, as well as for his wisdom and teaching ability, giving him the title "General of the Dharma" (Sanskrit: Dharmasenapati; Pali: Dhammasenāpati). Śāriputra is considered the disciple of the Buddha who was foremost in wisdom. His female counterpart was Khema.

== Moggallāna ==
Moggallāna, also known as Mahā Moggallāna or by his birth name Kolita, was one of the Buddha's closest disciples. He is considered the second of the Buddha's two foremost male disciples, together with Śāriputra. Traditional accounts relate that Maudgalyāyana and Śāriputra become spiritual wanderers in their youth. After having searched for spiritual truth for a while, they come into contact with the Buddhist teaching through verses that have become widely known in the Buddhist world. Eventually they meet the Buddha himself and ordain as monks under him. Maudgalyāyana attains enlightenment shortly after that.

Maudgalyayana and Śāriputra have a deep spiritual friendship. They are depicted in Buddhist art as the two disciples that accompany the Buddha, and they have complementing roles as teachers. As a teacher, Maudgalyayana is known for his psychic powers, and he is often depicted using these in his teaching methods. In many early Buddhist canons, Maudgalyāyana is instrumental in re-uniting the monastic community after Devadatta causes a schism. Furthermore, Maudgalyāyana is connected with accounts about the making of the first Buddha image. Maudgalyāyana dies at the age of eighty-four, killed through the efforts of a rival sect. This violent death is described in Buddhist scriptures as a result of Maudgalyāyana's karma of having killed his own parents in a previous life.

Through post-canonical texts, Maudgalyāyana became known for his filial piety through a popular account of him transferring his merits to his mother. This led to a tradition in many Buddhist countries known as the ghost festival, during which people dedicate their merits to their ancestors. Maudgalyāyana has also traditionally been associated with meditation and sometimes Abhidharma texts, as well as the Dharmaguptaka school. In the nineteenth century, relics were found attributed to him, which have been widely venerated.

== Mahākāśyapa ==
Mahā Kāśyapa or Mahākāśyapa (Pali: Mahākassapa) is regarded in Buddhism as an enlightened disciple, being foremost in ascetic practice. Mahākāśyapa assumed leadership of the monastic community following the paranirvāṇa (death) of the Buddha, presiding over the First Buddhist Council. He was considered to be the first patriarch in a number of early Buddhist schools and continued to have an important role as patriarch in the Chan and Zen tradition. In Buddhist texts, he assumed many identities, that of a renunciant saint, a lawgiver, an anti-establishment figure, but also a "guarantor of future justice" in the time of Maitreya—he has been described as "both the anchorite and the friend of mankind, even of the outcast".

In canonical Buddhist texts in several traditions, Mahākāśyapa was born as Pippali in a brahmin family, and entered an arranged marriage with a woman named Bhadda Kapilani. Both of them aspired to lead a celibate life, however, and they decided not to consummate their marriage. Having grown weary of the agricultural profession and the damage it did, they both left the lay life behind to become mendicants. Pippali later met the Buddha, under whom he was ordained as a monk, named Kāśyapa, but later called Mahākāśyapa to distinguish him from other disciples. Mahākāśyapa became an important disciple of the Buddha, to the extent that the Buddha exchanged his robe with him, which was a symbol of the transmittance of the Buddhist teaching. He became foremost in ascetic practices and attained enlightenment shortly after meeting the Buddha. He often had disputes with Ānanda, the attendant of the Buddha, due to their different dispositions and views. Despite his ascetic, strict and stern reputation, he paid an interest in community matters and teaching, and was known for his compassion for the poor, which sometimes caused him to be depicted as an anti-establishment figure. He had a prominent role in the cremation of the Buddha, acting as a sort of eldest son of the Buddha, as well as being the leader in the subsequent First Council. He is depicted as hesitatingly allowing Ānanda to participate in the council, and chastising him afterwards for a number of offenses the latter was regarded to have committed.

Mahākāśyapa's life as described in the early Buddhist texts has been considerably studied by scholars, who have been skeptical about his role in the cremation, his role toward Ānanda and the historical validity of the council itself. A number of scholars have hypothesized that the accounts have later been embellished to emphasize the values of the Buddhist establishment Mahākāśyapa stood for, emphasizing monastic discipline, brahmin and ascetic values, as opposed to the values of Ānanda and other disciples. Regardless, it is clear that Mahākāśyapa had an important role in the early days of the Buddhist community after the Buddha's parinirvāṇa, to help establish a stable monastic tradition. He effectively became the leader for the first twenty years after the Buddha, as he had become the most influential figure in the monastic community. For this reason, he was regarded by many early Buddhist schools as a sort of first patriarch, and was seen to have started a lineage of patriarchs of Buddhism. This further amplified the idea of him being the primary heir and elder son of the Buddha, which came to be symbolized by the robe Mahākāśyapa had received.

In many post-canonical texts, Mahākāśyapa decided at the end of his life to enter a state of meditation and suspended animation, which was believed to cause his physical remains to stay intact in a cave under a mountain called Kukkuṭapāda, until the coming of Maitreya Buddha in a next age. This story has led to several cults and practices, and affected some Buddhist countries up until early modern times. It has been interpreted by scholars as a narrative to physically connect Gautama Buddha with the next Buddha Maitreya, through the body of Mahākāśyapa and Gautama Buddha's robe, which covered Mahākāśyapa's remains. In Chan Buddhism, this account was less emphasized, but Mahākāśyapa was seen to have received a special mind-to-mind transmission from Gautama Buddha outside of orthodox scripture, which became essential to the identity of Chan. Again, the robe was an important symbol in this transmission. Apart from having a role in texts and lineage, Mahākāśyapa has often been depicted in Buddhist art as a symbol of reassurance and hope for the future of Buddhism.

== Subhuti ==
Subhūti (Pali: Subhūti; Chinese: 須菩提/须菩提; pinyin: Xūpútí) was one of the ten principal disciples of the Buddha. In Theravada Buddhism he is considered the disciple who was foremost in being "worthy of gifts" (Pali: dakkhiṇeyyānaṃ) and "living remote and in peace" (Pali: araṇavihārīnaṃ aggo). In Mahayana Buddhism, he is considered foremost in understanding emptiness (Sanskrit: Śūnyatā).

Subhūti was born into a wealthy family and was a relative of Anāthapiṇḍika, the Buddha's chief patron. In the Theravada tradition he is Anāthapiṇḍika's younger brother. In the northern Buddhist tradition he is Anāthapiṇḍika's nephew. Subhūti became a monk after hearing the Buddha teach at the dedication ceremony of Jetavana Monastery. After being ordained Subhūti went into the forest and became an arahant meditating on loving-kindness (Pali: mettā). It is said that due to his mastery of loving-kindness meditation, any gift offered to him bore the greatest merit for the donor, thus earning him the title of foremost in being "worthy of gifts". Subhūti is a major figure in Mahayana Buddhism and is one of the central figures in Prajñāpāramitā sutras. For instance, the Diamond Sutra is framed as a question-and-answer between the Buddha and Subhūti, resulting in the latter's deepened insight into emptiness, a core philosophical component underlying the entire Mahayana worldview.

== Purna Maitrayaniputra ==
Pūrṇa Maitrāyaniputra (Sk.) or Puṇṇa Mantānīputta (Pl.). He was also called Purna for short. He was the greatest teacher of the Law out of all the disciples. He was the top master of preaching.

== Katyayana ==
Kātyāyana or Mahākātyāyana (Sk.) or Mahākaccāna (Pl.). He understood Shakyamuni Buddha's lecture the best. Although he had only five master in the rural areas, he was permitted to learn Vinaya by the Buddha.

== Anuruddha ==
Anuruddha (Pl.) or Aniruddha (Sk.) was a top master of clairvoyance and the practice of the four foundations of mindfulness (satipatthana). Aniruddha was a cousin of Shakyamuni Buddha. He and Ananda became monks at the same time. He was foremost in divine insight. He lost his sight because he swore not to sleep after getting criticized by Lord Buddha. And later he got another pair of eyes that is believed to have the power to see the truth.

== Upāli ==
Upāli (Sanskrit and Pāli) was, according to early Buddhist texts, mainly responsible for the reciting and reviewing monastic discipline (Pāli and Sanskrit: vinaya) on the First Buddhist Council. Upāli was born as a low-caste barber. He met the Buddha when still a child, and later, when the Sakya princes received ordination, he did so as well. He was, in fact, ordained before the princes, putting humility before caste. Having been ordained, Upāli learnt both Buddhist doctrine (Pali: Dhamma; Sanskrit: Dharma) and vinaya. His preceptor was Kappitaka. Upāli became known for his mastery and strictness of vinaya, and was consulted often about vinaya matters. A notable case he decided about was that of the monk Ajjuka, who was accused of partisanship in a conflict about real estate. During the First Council, Upāli received the important role of reciting the vinaya, for which he is mostly known.

Scholars have analyzed Upāli's role and that of other disciples in the early texts, and it has been suggested that his role in the texts was emphasized during a period of compiling that stressed monastic discipline, during which Mahākassapa (Sanskrit: Mahākāśyapa) and Upāli became the most important disciples. Later, Upāli and his pupils became known as vinayadharas (Pāli; 'custodians of the vinaya'), who preserved the monastic discipline after the Buddha's parinibbāna (Sanskrit: parinirvāṇa; passing into final Nirvana). This lineage became an important part of the identity of Ceylonese and Burmese Buddhism. In China, the 7th-century Vinaya school referred to Upāli as their patriarch and it was believed that one of their founders was a reincarnation of him. The technical conversations about vinaya between the Buddha and Upāli were recorded in the Pāli and Sarvāstivāda traditions, and have been suggested as an important subject of study for modern-day ethics in American Buddhism.

== Rāhula ==
Rāhula (Pāli and Sanskrit) was the only son of Siddhārtha Gautama, and his wife, princess Yaśodharā. He is mentioned in numerous Buddhist texts, from the early period onward. Accounts about Rāhula indicate a mutual impact between Prince Siddhārtha's life and those of his family members. According to the Pāli tradition, Rāhula is born on the day of Prince Siddhārta's renunciation, and is therefore named Rāhula, meaning a fetter on the path to enlightenment. According to the Mūlasarvāstivāda tradition, and numerous other later sources, however, Rāhula is only conceived on the day of Prince Siddhārtha, and is born six years later, when Prince Siddhārtha becomes enlightened as the Buddha. This long gestation period is explained by bad karma from previous lives of both Yaśodharā and of Rāhula himself, although more naturalistic reasons are also given. As a result of the late birth, Yaśodharā needs to prove that Rāhula is really Prince Siddhārtha's son, which she eventually does successfully by an act of truth. Historian Wolfgang Schumann has argued that Prince Siddhārtha conceived Rāhula and waited for his birth, to be able to leave the palace with the king and queen's permission, but Orientalist Noël Péri considered it more likely that Rāhula was born after Prince Siddhārtha left his palace.

Between seven and fifteen years after Rāhula is born, the Buddha returns to Kapilavastu, where Yaśodharā has Rāhula ask the Buddha for the throne of the Śākya clan. The Buddha responds by having Rāhula ordain as the first Buddhist novice monk. He teaches the young novice about truth, self-reflection, and not-self, eventually leading to Rāhula's enlightenment. Although early accounts state that Rāhula dies before the Buddha does, later tradition has it that Rāhula is one of the disciples that outlives the Buddha, guarding the Buddha's Dispensation until the rising of the next Buddha. Rāhula is known in Buddhist texts for his eagerness for learning, and was honored by novice monks and nuns throughout Buddhist history. His accounts have led to a perspective in Buddhism of seeing children as hindrances to the spiritual life on the one hand, and as people with potential for enlightenment on the other hand.

== Ānanda ==
Ānanda was the primary attendant of the Buddha and one of his ten principal disciples. Among the Buddha's many disciples, Ānanda stood out for having the best memory. Most of the texts of the early Buddhist Sutta-Piṭaka (Pāli; Sanskrit: Sūtra-Piṭaka) are attributed to his recollection of the Buddha's teachings during the First Buddhist Council. For that reason, he is known as the "Treasurer of the Dhamma", with Dhamma (Sanskrit: Dharma) referring to the Buddha's teaching. In Early Buddhist Texts, Ānanda is the first cousin of the Buddha. Although the texts do not agree on most things about Ānanda's early life, they do agree that Ānanda is ordained as a monk and that Puṇṇa Mantānīputta (Sanskrit: Pūrṇa Maitrāyaṇīputra) becomes his teacher. Twenty years in the Buddha's ministry, Ānanda becomes the attendant of the Buddha, when the Buddha selects him for this job. Ānanda performs his duties with great devotion and care, and acts as an intermediary between the Buddha and the laypeople, as well as the Saṅgha (monastic community). He accompanies the Buddha for the rest of his life, acting not only as an assistant, but also a secretary and a mouthpiece.

Scholars are skeptical about the historicity of many events in Ānanda's life, especially the First Council, and consensus about this has yet to be established. A traditional account can be drawn from early texts, commentaries, and post-canonical chronicles. Ānanda has an important role in establishing the order of bhikkhunis, when he requests the Buddha on behalf of the latter's foster-mother Mahāpajāpati Gotamī (Sanskrit: Mahāprajāpatī Gautamī) to allow her to be ordained. Ānanda also accompanies the Buddha in the last year of his life, and therefore is witness to many tenets and principles that the Buddha conveys and establishes before his death, including the well-known principle that the Buddhist community should take his teaching and discipline as their refuge, and that the Buddha will not appoint a new leader. The final period of the Buddha's life also shows that Ānanda is still very much attached to the Buddha's person, and he witnesses the Buddha's passing with great sorrow.

Shortly after the Buddha's death, the First Council is convened, and Ānanda manages to attain enlightenment just before the council starts, which is a requirement. He has a historical role during the council as the living memory of the Buddha, reciting many of the Buddha's discourses and checking them for accuracy. During the same council, however, he is chastised by Mahākassapa (Sanskrit: Mahākāśyapa) and the rest of the Saṅgha for allowing women to be ordained and failing to understand or respect the Buddha at several crucial moments. Ānanda continues to teach until the end of his life, passing on his spiritual heritage to his pupils Sāṇavāsī (Sanskrit: Śāṇakavāsī) and Majjhantika (Sanskrit: Madhyāntika), among others, who later assume a leading role in the Second and Third Councils. Ānanda dies in 463 BCE, and stūpas (monuments) are erected at the river where he dies.

Ānanda is one of the most loved figures in Buddhism. Ānanda is known for his memory, erudition and compassion, and is often praised by the Buddha for these matters. He functions as a foil to the Buddha, however, in that he still has worldly attachments and is not yet enlightened, as opposed to the Buddha. In the Sanskrit textual traditions, Ānanda is widely considered the patriarch of the Dhamma, who stands in a spiritual lineage, receiving the teaching from Mahākassapa and passing them on to his own pupils. Ānanda has been honored by bhikkhunis since early medieval times for his merits in establishing the nun's order. In recent times, the composer Richard Wagner wrote a draft for a libretto about Ānanda, which was made into the opera Wagner Dream by Jonathan Harvey in 2007.

== Similar lists ==
In the Pāli text Udāna, a similar list is mentioned, but these are eleven not ten disciples, and five in the list are different. Although in the early Sanskrit and Chinese texts, there are only four enlightened disciples, in later tradition there are eight enlightened disciples (found in the Mañjuśrī-mūla-kalpa; there still are in the Burmese tradition), sixteen (in Chinese and Tibetan texts) and then eighteen disciples (in Chinese texts). (Note: Tambiah (1984, p. 23) and Lamotte (1988), the latter cited in Ray (1994, pp. 205–206 note 2a–d).) There is also a Chinese tradition with five hundred disciples.

| No. | Mañjuśrī-mūla-kalpa | Mahāyāna discourses | Pāli discourses |
|---|---|---|---|
| 1. | Śāriputra | Śāriputra | Śāriputra |
| 2. | Maudgalyāyana | Maudgalyāyana | Maudgalyāyana |
| 3. | Mahākāśyapa/Gavāṃpati | Mahākāśyapa | Mahākāśyapa |
| 4. | Subhūti/Piṇḍolabhāradvāja | Subhūti | Mahākātyāyana |
| 5. | Rāhula/Pilindavatsa | Pūrṇa Maitrāyaniputra | Mahākoṭṭhita |
| 6. | Nanda/Rāhula | Aniruddha | Kaphiṇa |
| 7. | Bhadrika/Mahākāśyapa | Mahākātyāyana | Mahācunda |
| 8. | Kaphiṇa/Ānanda | Upāli | Aniruddha |
| 9. | N/A | Rāhula | Revata |
| 10. | N/A | Ānanda | Devadatta |
| 11. | N/A | N/A | Ānanda |
