= Yaśodharā =

Wife of Prince Siddhartha (Gautama Buddha)

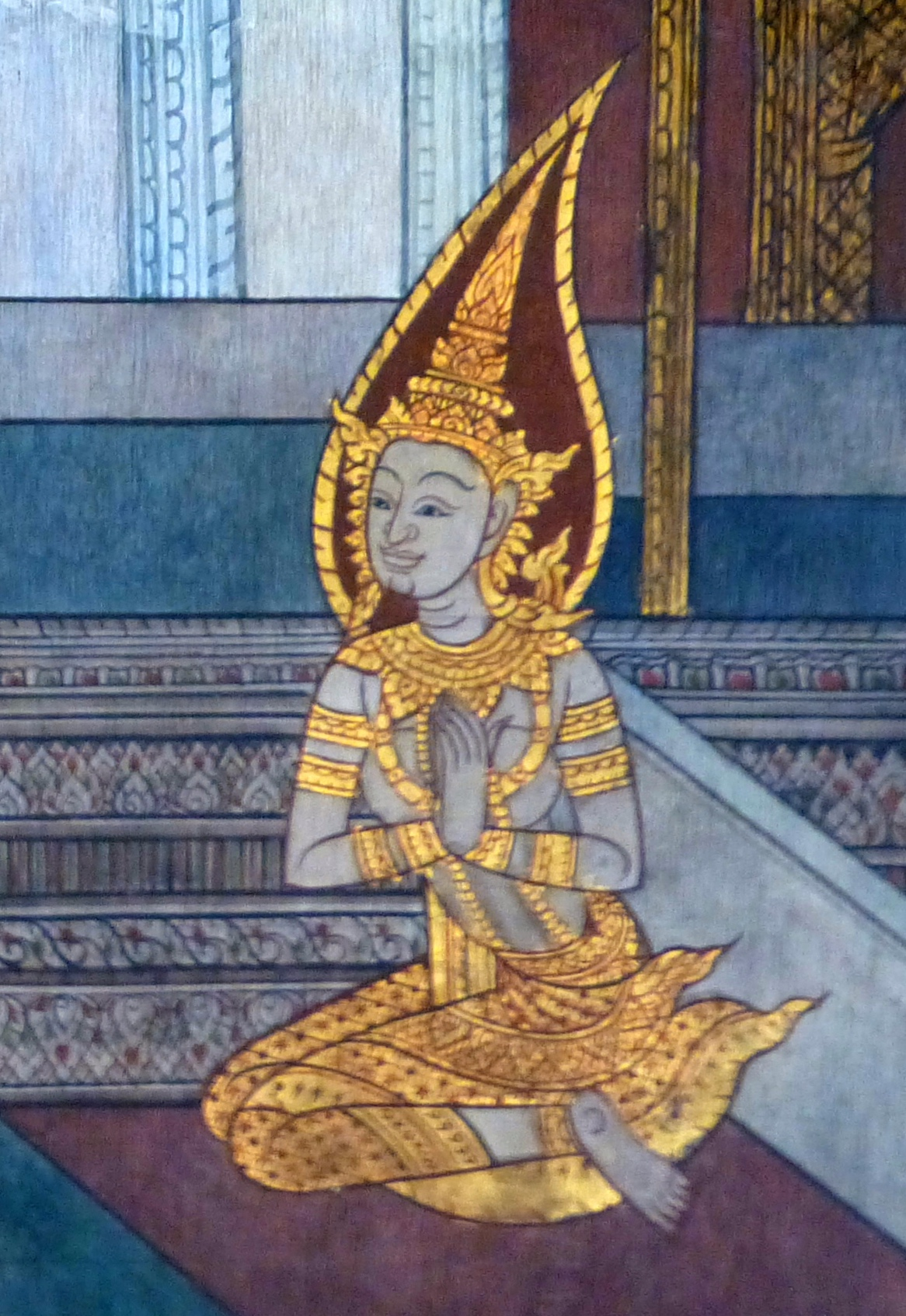
- Yashodhara, Wat Pho, Bangkok, Thailand
- Born: c. 563 BCE; Devdaha, Koliya Kingdom
- Died: c. 485 BCE (aged 78)
- Children: Rāhula
- Spouse: Siddhartha (Note: Married in c. 547 BCE)
- Father: Suppabuddha
- Mother: Amitā
- Religion: Buddhism

Yaśodharā or Yashodhara (Note: (Pali: Yasodharā, Sanskrit: यशोधरा, romanized: Yaśodharā)), originally known as Bhaddakaccānā (Pāli) or Bhadrakātyāyani (Sanskrit), was an Indian princess and the wife of Prince Siddhartha prior to his renunciation to become a śramaṇa (ascetic). She was the mother of Rāhula, and the niece of Mahaprajapati Gautami. Later, she became a Bhikkhunī and is considered an arahatā.

== Life ==
Yaśodharā was the daughter of King Suppabuddha and Amitā. She was born on the same day in the month of Vaishaka as prince Siddhartha. Her grandfather was Añjana, a Koliya chief, her father was Suppabuddha and her mother, Amitā, came from a Shakya family. The Shakya and the Koliya were branches of the Ādicca (Sanskrit: Aditya) or Ikshvaku dynasty. There were no other families considered equal to them in the region, and therefore members of these two royal families married only among themselves.

Yaśodharā was wedded to the Shakya prince Siddhartha when they were both 16. At the age of 29, she gave birth to their only child, a boy named Rāhula. On the night of his birth, the prince left the palace; his departure is called the Great Renunciation. Yaśodharā was devastated and overcome with grief. Once prince Siddhartha left his home at night for enlightenment, the next day, everyone was surprised by the absence of the prince. The famous Indian Hindi poet Maithili Sharan Gupt (1886–1964) tried to express the emotions of Yaśodharā in his eponymous poem about her, translated by Gurmeet Kaur:

Oh dear, if he would have told me,
Would he still have found me a roadblock?
He gave me lot of respect,
But did he recognize my existence in true sense?
I recognized him,
If he had this thought in his heart
Oh dear, if he would have told me.

Later, when she realised that he had left, Yaśodharā decided to lead a simple life. Although relatives sent her messages to say that they would maintain her, she did not take up those offers. Several princes sought her hand but she rejected their proposals. Throughout his six-year absence, Princess Yaśodharā followed the news of his actions closely.

When the Buddha visited Kapilavastu after enlightenment, Yaśodharā did not go to see her former husband but asked her son Rāhula to go to the Buddha to seek inheritance. For herself, she thought: "Surely if I have gained any virtue at all the Lord will come to my presence." In order to fulfill her wish, Buddha came into her presence and admired her patience and sacrifice. King Suddhodana told Buddha how his daughter-in-law, Yasodhara, had spent her life in grief, without her husband. Also, there is Naraseeha Gatha, a Buddhist verse which was recited by Princess Yasodhara to Rahula, explaining the noble virtues and physical characteristics of the Buddha after his enlightenment. "Gatha" refers to a poetic verse or hymn, often used in Buddhist scriptures to convey teachings or express devotion.

Some time after her son Rāhula became a monk, Yaśodharā also entered the Order of Monks and Nuns and within time attained the state of an arhat. She was ordained as bhikkhuni with the five hundred women following Mahapajapati Gotami that first established the bhikkhuni order. She died at 78, two years before Buddha's parinirvana (death).

In his book The Great Chronicle of Buddhas, the Burmese monk Mingun Sayadaw wrote about Yaśodharā-Bhadda Kaccana Theri:

Bhaddha Kaccana Theri, after attaining arahatship, was most proficient in the exercise of supernormal powers. At one sitting, in a single adverting of her mind (āvajjana), she could recall all her previous existences over one incalculable period and a hundred thousand world-systems. This extraordinary feat of hers became the talk of the bhikkhu-world. With reference to that wide reputation, the Buddha, in naming distinguished bhikkhunis in a congregation in Jetavana monastery, declared:

"Bhikkhus, among My bhikkhuni-disciples who are endowed with great supernormal powers, Bhikkhunt Bhaddha Kaccana is the foremost etadagga (first among the first").

== Legends ==
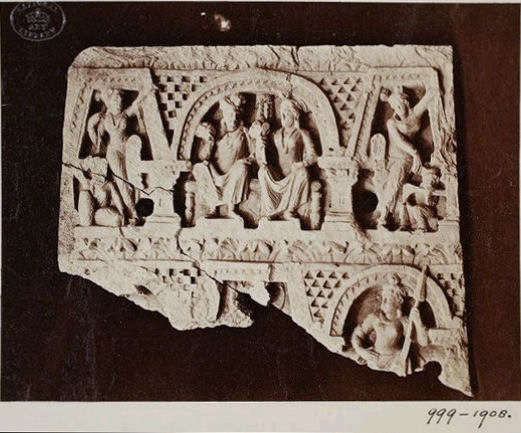
Prince Siddhattha and Princess Yasodhara, 1st–2nd century CE, Gandharan style. Lahore Museum.

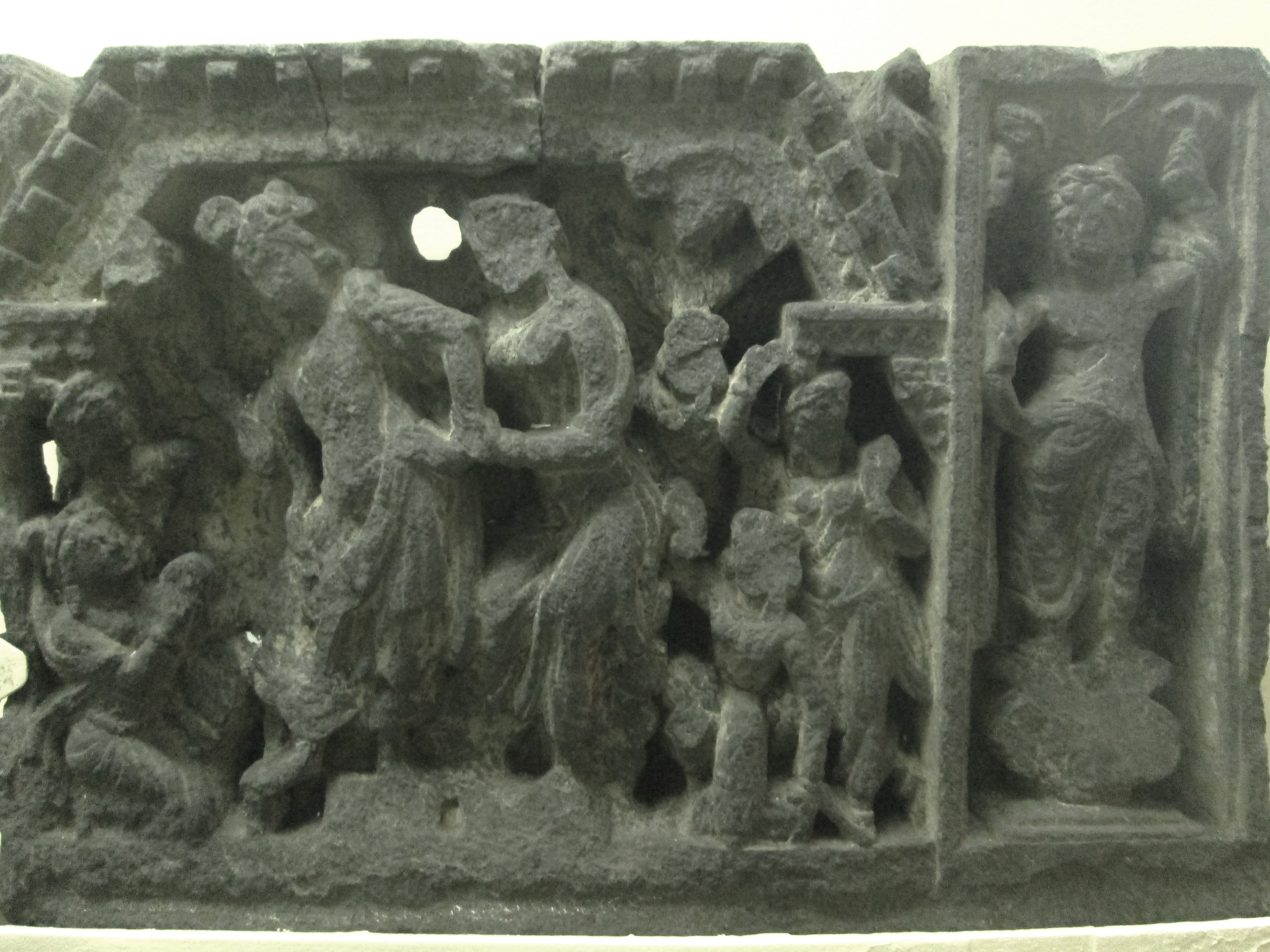
Siddhartha held by Yasodhara, Loriyan Tangai.

In the Chinese: 佛本行集經, The Collective Sutra of the Buddha's Past Acts, Yashodharā meets Siddhārtha Gautama for the first time in a previous life, when as the young Brahmin (ancient Nepali priest) Sumedha, he is formally identified as a future Buddha by the buddha of that era, Dīpankara Buddha. Waiting in the city of Paduma for Dīpankara Buddha, he tries to buy flowers as an offering but soon learns that the king already bought all the flowers for his own offering. Yet, as Dipankara is approaching, Sumedha spots a girl named Sumithra (or Bhadra) holding seven lotus flowers in her hands. He speaks to her with the intention of buying one of her flowers, but she recognises at once his potential and offers him five of the lotuses if he would promise that they would become husband and wife in all their next existences. (Note: See Malalasekera, G.P. (1960). "Rāhulamātā". Dictionary of Pali Proper Names. Vol. 2. Pali Text Society. OCLC 793535195; Hudson, Bob; Gutman, Pamela; Maung, Win (2018). "Buddha's Life in Konbaung Period Bronzes from Yazagyo". Journal of Burma Studies. 22 (1): 1–30. doi:10.1353/jbs.2018.0000. S2CID 192318894. Archived from the original on 26 April 2019; and Zhang, J. (2017). "The Creation of Avalokiteśvara: Exploring His Origin in the Northern Āgamas". Canadian Journal of Buddhist Studies. 12: 1–62. Archived from the original on 30 April 2019.)

In the thirteenth chapter of the Lotus Sutra, Yaśodharā receives a prediction of future buddhahood from Gautama Buddha as does Mahapajapati.

== Names ==
The meaning of the name Yaśodhara (Sanskrit) [from yaśas "glory, splendour" + dhara "bearing" from the verbal root dhri "to bear, support"] is Bearer of glory. The names she has been called besides Yaśodharā are: Yaśodharā Theri (doyenne Yaśodharā), Bimbādevī, Bhaddakaccānā and Rāhulamātā (mother of Rahula). In the Pali Canon, the name Yaśodharā is not found; there are two references to Bhaddakaccānā.

Several other names are identified as wives of the Buddha in different Buddhist traditions, including Gopā or Gopī, Mṛgajā, and Manodharā; Thomas Rhys Davids offered the interpretation that the Buddha had a single wife who acquired various titles and epithets over the years, eventually leading to the creation of origin stories for multiple wives. Noel Peri was the first scholar to treat the issue at length, examining the Chinese and Tibetan sources as well as the Pali. He observed that early sources (translated before the 5th Century) seemed to consistently identify the Buddha's wife as 'Gopī', and that after a period of inconsistency 'Yaśodhara' emerged as the favored name for texts translated in the latter half of the 5th Century and later.

== Yasodharā's attitude to the Great Renunciation ==
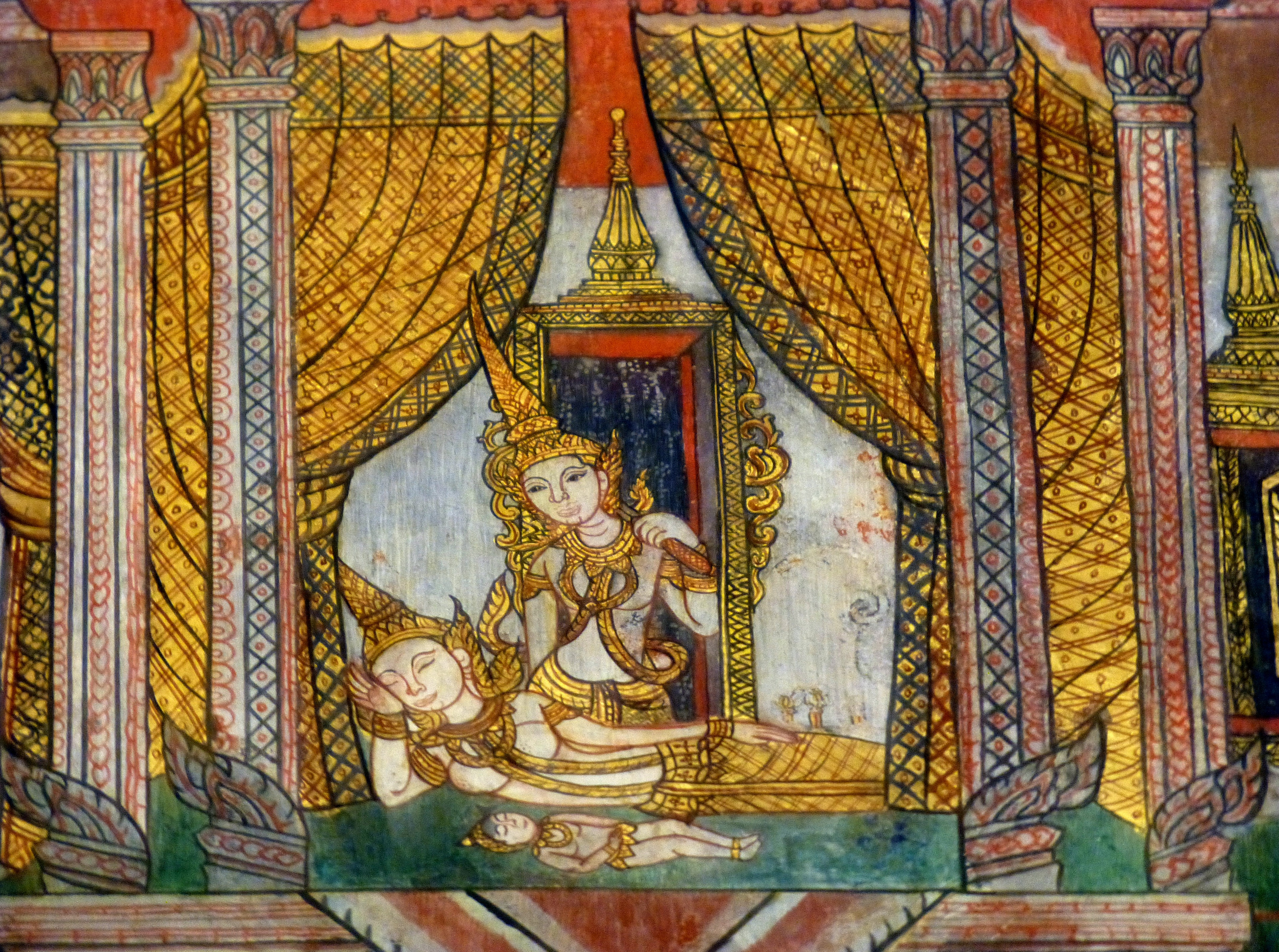
The Renunciation (detail). Siddhartha leaves his sleeping wife and son, Wat Kasattrathirat, Ayutthaya, Thailand.

Some non-scholastic publications say that Yasodhara was angry at the Buddha's departure, while others do not. Some studies say her anger was short-lasting: she was sorrowful not resentful.

Scholars say that Yasodhara felt not anger, but sorrow, and a desire to emulate him, to follow him into renunciation:

"On the day of his birth, the Prince left the palace. Yasodharā was devastated and overcome with grief. Hearing that her husband was leading a holy Life, she emulated him by removing her jewellery, wearing a plain yellow robe and eating only one meal a day."

Eastern poetry likewise says Yasodhara was not angry and surprised at his departure; she was merely sorrowful: "Yasodharā's grief is not anger at his departure. She has known from the beginning that to be a Buddha was his goal and she has shared his life and his efforts toward that goal in all their past existences in samsāra. She has done so with a full knowledge of what it means. What she cannot understand is that on this one occasion he has gone leaving her behind, alone, and without a word to her."

== See also ==
- Thero
- Padmasambhava
- Women in Buddhism
- Pabhāvatī
- Mahapajapati Gotami
- Suddhodana
- Gautama Buddha
- Sundari Nanda
- Nanda
- Yaśodharapura

== Literature ==
- The Buddha and His Teaching, Nārada, Buddhist Missionary Society, Kuala Lumpur, Malaysia, 1988, 784 p. ISBN 967-9920-44-5 ;
- 'Yasodhara and the Buddha,' Author: Vanessa R. Sasson, Bloomsbury Press, 2021, ISBN 9781350163171
- The First Buddhist Women: Translations and Commentaries on the Therigatha Author: Susan Murcott, ISBN 0-938077-42-2
- Life of Princess Yashodara: Wife and Disciple of the Lord Buddha Devee, Sunity (Author) and Bhuban Mohen Murkerjie (Illustrator), Kessinger Publishing, 2003 (Reprint of the original 1929 edition), ISBN 978-0-7661-5844-3 (13), ISBN 0-7661-5844-6 (10), online: Life of Princess Yashodara: Wife and Disciple of the Lord Buddha (1929) : Devee, Sunity, Mukerjie, Bhuban Mohen: Amazon.sg: Books. Retrieved 21 September 2020.
- Yashodhara: Six Seasons Without You, by Subhash Jaireth, Wild Peony Press, Broadway, NSW, Australia, 2003, ISBN 1-876957-05-0
- Stars at Dawn: Forgotten Stories of Women in the Buddha's Life, Author: Wendy Garling, Shambhala Publications 2016, ISBN 978-1-61180-265-8
