= Pabhāvatī =

Figure in Buddhist cosmology

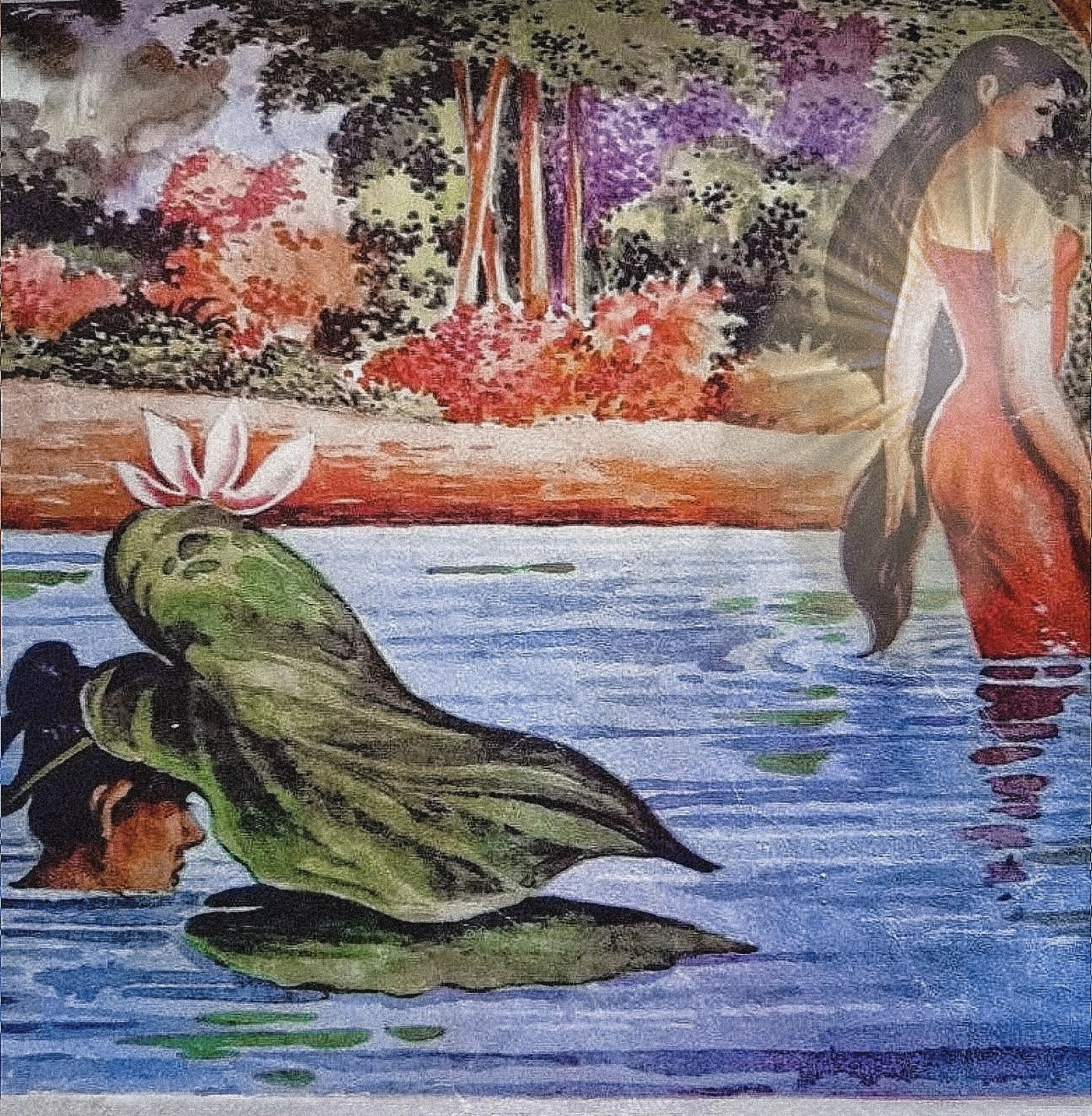
- A painting of King Kusa and Pabhāvatī depicting King Kusa trying to peek at Pabhāvatī while she is bathing.

In-universe information
- Species: Human
- Gender: Female
- Title: Princess of Sāgala; Queen Consort of Kusāvatī
- Spouse: King Kusa
- Nationality: Madra kingdom (Mythological)

Pabhāvatī (Burmese: ပဘာဝတီ) was a princess of Madda Kingdom and figure in the Buddhist tale Kusa Jātaka. She was one of the eight daughters of King Madda of Sāgala and the wife of King Kusa, who is considered a past incarnation of the Buddha.

According to legend, she possessed unparalleled beauty in the world, with rays of light as if from the risen sun, so profound that it could illuminate seven chambers without the need for any lamp light. She was a past incarnation of Yaśodharā, the wife of Prince Siddhartha (the Buddha).

== Legends ==
According to the Kusa Jātaka (The Birth Story of King Kusa), a young man lived in a village near Varanasi with his brother and sister-in-law. One day, while the young man was absent, his brother's wife prepared delicious cakes, setting aside a portion for him before consuming the rest. Shortly after, a monk appeared at the house to receive alms. Unaware that the monk was, in fact, an enlightened arhat, she offered the remaining cakes to him. When the young man returned and discovered that the cakes meant for him had been given away, he angrily reclaimed them from the alms bowl.

At that moment, his sister-in-law donated some butter, which then turned a golden color. Filled with joy, she made a wish, desiring to be reborn as a beautiful woman who lived far away from the young man. He heard her wish, and made his own wish while offering his cakes back: to live one hundred yojanas away from her, before bringing her to his home to become his wife. The young man's initial reclamation of the cakes led to a subsequent incarnation as an unpleasant-looking man. Meanwhile, as a result of her merit in offering both the cakes and the butter, his sister-in-law was reborn as a beautiful princess named Pabhāvatī, the eldest daughter of the king of Madda. The young man's eventual contrition likewise led to his wish being granted.

Pabhāvatī was renowned for her exceptional beauty, which rivalled that of the celestial beings Devaccharā. In the neighbouring Malla kingdom, Crown Prince Kusa, known for his unsightly appearance, consistently refused marriage proposals. After rejecting his fourth suitor, Kusa expressed a desire to marry a woman who resembled a golden statue he had created.

The king and queen of Malla discovered that Pabhāvatī was a perfect match for the statue's beauty. Their offer of marriage was accepted, and Pabhāvatī was brought to the Malla kingdom to marry Kusa. However, the Malla queen feared Pabhāvatī might divorce Kusa upon seeing his appearance, and imposed the condition that the couple would not live together during the day. After their marriage, Kusa ascended the throne and Pabhāvatī became queen. Eager to see her during the day, King Kusa disguised himself as a palace servant and sought opportunities to spy on her. One day, while Pabhāvatī was bathing, she noticed Kusa and was horrified by his appearance—she mistook him for an ogre and fled in shock. Once she realized it was her husband, she could not bear his appearance and returned to her home.

Kusa followed Pabhāvatī and performed many menial tasks in an attempt to win her favor, but after seven months of effort, he was unsuccessful. Disheartened, he decided to leave the kingdom. Witnessing the situation, Śakra disguised himself as an envoy and sent a message to seven kingdoms, declaring that they could offer marriage proposals to Pabhāvatī now that she was divorced from King Kusa. When the kings from the seven kingdoms marched toward Madda with the intent to conquer it, the King of Madda, upon hearing the news, ordered Pabhāvatī to be killed and her body divided into seven parts to be given to the seven kings. Fearing for her life, Pabhāvatī sought forgiveness and pleaded for help from King Kusa. In response, Kusa defeated the seven kings in battle. However, he chose not to kill them and instead spared their lives, arranging for each of them to marry one of Pabhāvatī's seven sisters.

In the Sinhalese version, to remove Kusa’s ugliness, Śakra places the octagonal gem called Virocana around his neck. This gem also appears in Mahā Ummagga Jātaka.

== Analysis ==
According to Liz Wilson, the jataka's Buddhist authors used "ironic wit and double entendre" to illustrate "the futility of beauty, the rapacity of the sex act, and the perversity of sexual desire."

Aung Min Niang, a lecturer at Yangon University, has analyzed several modern dramatic adaptations of the original Jataka. He finds the contrast between the wise yet unattractive King Kusa and the radiant Princess Pabavati particularly intriguing, as it emphasizes the attraction between these two opposing forces. He argues that this dynamic is one of the most compelling aspects of these adaptations.

== In popular culture ==
Wunna Kyawhtin Yan Naing Sein, a renowned Mahāgīta songwriter, composed a tribute to the incomparable beauty of Pabhāvatī in his legacy song "A-long-daw Kutha" (Bodhisattva Kusa). In the song, he describes Pabhāvatī as looking like a celestial being who fell from the heavens and shines in the seven chambers without light.

Her story remains a significant part of popular Burmese theater, where she is portrayed as a romantic figure.

Pabawaddy (a Burmese transliteration of the Sanskrit name) is a common designation or metaphor for a beautiful woman in Myanmar.

=== Film ===
- Portrayed by Myint Myint Khine in the Burmese film Min Kutha and Pabawaddy
- Portrayed by Pan Yamone Chit in the Burmese film Min Kutha and Pabawaddy
