= Mahayana Canon =

Mahayana canon is the canon of scriptures of Mahayana Buddhism.

Mahayana canon may specifically refer to:

- Mahayana sutras, sutras specific to the Mahayana school
- Chinese Buddhist canon, the total body of Buddhist literature deemed canonical in China, Korea, Japan and Vietnam
  - Tripitaka Koreana, the original, intact Chinese canon on woodblocks, as produced in the 13th century Korea
  - Taishō Tripiṭaka, the definitive 20th century edition of the Chinese canon with Japanese commentaries
- Tibetan Buddhist canon, a loosely defined collection of sacred texts and commentaries recognized by various sects of Tibetan Buddhism
  - Kangyur, sacred texts recognized by various schools of Tibetan Buddhism
  - Tengyur, the commentaries, translated and original, of the schools of Tibetan Buddhism

== See also ==
- Tripiṭaka, the general name of the Buddhist canon
- Early Buddhist texts, the pre-canon texts
- Pali Canon, the standard scripture collection of the Theravada Buddhist tradition
- Gandhāran Buddhist texts, the oldest preserved collection of Buddhist manuscripts of the canon
