= H. W. Schumann =

German diplomat and indologist

Hans Wolfgang Schumann (31 January 1928 – 26 June 2019) was a German diplomat as well as an Indologist and Buddhologist.

== Life ==
Schumann was born in Düsseldorf, Germany. After an apprenticeship as a book publisher, he studied Indology, religious studies, ethnology, comparative religions and social anthropology at the University of Bonn in 1951. In 1957 he received his Ph.D. degree for a thesis on Buddhist philosophy, while there he worked under Gustav Mensching in the subject of Indology with an investigation into the Bedeutung und Bedeutungsentwicklung des Terminus Samkhara im frühen Buddhismus (Meaning and development of the meaning of the term Samkhara in early Buddhism). From 1960 to 1963 he worked as a lecturer at the Banaras Hindu University in India. In 1963, he had joined the Foreign services of the Federal Republic of Germany and served in consular and diplomatic capacities at the West German missions such as Kolkata, Yangon, Chicago, and Colombo as a lecturer to teach German language through the German Academic Exchange Service. In 1985 to 1986 he held a teaching position in Buddhism at the University of Bonn. Until his retirement in 1988 he was the Consul-General of the Federal Republic of Germany in Mumbai. Later Schumann was the recipient of the Rabindranath Tagore Literary Prize for his works about Buddhism. He died in Bonn.

== Works ==
- Der Mahāyāna-Buddhismus: Die zweite Drehung des Dharma-Rades. Diederichs, München, 1990.
- Der historische Buddha: Leben und Lehre des Gotama. Diederichs Gelbe Reihe, München 2004.
- Handbuch Buddhismus: Die zentralen Lehren: Ursprung und Gegenwart. Diederichs, Kreuzlingen / München 2000.
- Die grossen Götter Indiens: Grundzüge von Hinduismus und Buddhismus. Hugendubel 2004.
- Buddhismus: Stifter, Schulen und Systeme. Diederichs Gelbe Reihe, München 2005.
- Buddhabildnisse – Ihre Symbolik und Geschichte. Werner Kristkeitz Verlag, Heidelberg 2007.

== Biographies of H.W. Schumann ==
- Axel Rodeck: Ein Indologe und Buddhist. Zum 80. Geburtstag von Dr. Hans Wolfgang Schumann.
- Volker Zotz: Hans Wolfgang Schumann zum 80. Geburtstag. In: Buddhismus aktuell. August/2/2008.
