= John S. Strong =

American academic specializing in Buddhism (born 1948)

- Born: September 13, 1948 (age 78); Tongxian, Hebei, China
- Occupation: Professor
- Known for: Buddhist Studies

Academic background
- Education: Oberlin College; Hartford Seminary Foundation; University of Chicago

John S. Strong is an American academic, who is the Charles A. Dana Professor Emeritus of Religious Studies at Bates College. Strong specializes in Buddhist studies and with emphasis on the Buddha's biography, relics, and the legends and cults of South Asia.

John Strong was born in China, and completed his secondary education in Switzerland. He graduated from the Oberlin College, where he joined Phi Beta Kappa society. He then obtained a master's degree at the Hartford Seminary Foundation.

Strong received his Ph.D. in History of Religions from the University of Chicago in 1977, and joined Bates in 1978. He received a fellowship from the National Endowment for the Humanities in 1982, as an Assistant Professor of Religion. He was promoted to a full professor in 1986.

== Research ==
Strong's research program is in the area of Buddhist Studies, with a special focus on Buddhist legendary and cultic traditions in India and South Asia. He has received fellowships for his work from the National Endowment for the Humanities, the Fulbright Foundation and the Guggenheim Foundation, and has been a visiting professor at the University of Peradeniya, the University of Chicago, and Harvard, Princeton, and Stanford Universities. He is the author of numerous articles and books on Buddhist topics:

- The Legend of King Asoka (Princeton, 1983);
- The Legend and Cult of Upagupta (Princeton, 1992);
- The Experience of Buddhism (Wadsworth, 1995);
- The Buddha: A Beginner’s Guide (OneWorld Publications, 2001);
- Relics of the Buddha (Princeton, 2004);
- Buddhisms: An Introduction (OneWorld, 2015).

== See also ==
- Trapusa and Bahalika
