= Chinese Buddhist apocrypha =

Texts outside historical Buddhist canon

In Buddhist studies, particularly East Asian Buddhist studies, post-canonical Buddhist texts, Buddhist apocrypha or Spurious Sutras and Sastras designate texts that are not accepted as canonical by some historical Buddhist schools or communities who referred to a canon. The term is principally applied to texts that purport to represent Buddhist teaching translated from Indian texts, but were written in East Asia.

== Examples ==
- Innumerable Meanings Sutra
- Sutra of the Original Acts which Adorn the Bodhisattvas (菩薩本業瓔珞經, P'u-sa ying-lo pen-yeh ching)
- Sutra of Adamantine Absorption (金剛三昧經, Kŭmgang sammaegyŏng)
- Sutra on the Conversion of the Barbarians (老子化胡經, Lao-tzu Hua-hu ching)

== See also ==
- Atthakatha
- Chinese Buddhist canon
- Early Buddhist Texts
- Mahayana Canon
- Pāli Canon
- Tripitaka

=== Sources ===
- Muller, Charles (1998). "East Asian Apocryphal Scriptures: Their Origin and Role in the Development of Sinitic Buddhism". Bulletin of Toyo Gakuen University. 6: 63–76.

== Bibliography ==
- Arai, K.; Bando, S.; Cleary, J.C.; Gregory, P.N.; Shih, H. (2005). Apocryphal Scriptures, Berkeley, Numata Center for Buddhist Translation and Research, ISBN 1-886439-29-X. (Translations of the Bequeathed Teaching Sutra, the Ullambana Sutra, the Sutra of Forty-two Sections, The Sutra of Perfect Enlightenment, and the Sutra on the Profundity of Filial Love)
- Buswell, Robert E.; ed. (1990). Chinese Buddhist Apocrypha, Honolulu: University of Hawaii Press, ISBN 0585349630
- Buswell, Robert E.; ed. (2003). Encyclopedia of Buddhism, New York: Macmillan Reference Lib. ISBN 0028657187
- Epstein, Ron (1976). The Shurangama-Sutra (T. 945): A Reappraisal of its Authenticity, presented at the annual meeting of the American Oriental Society, March 16–18, 1976, Philadelphia, Pennsylvania
- Harada Waso 原田和宗 (2010). 「般若心経」の成立史論 (title tr into English - History of the Establishment of Prajñaparamitahrdayasūtram). 東京: Daizo-shuppan 大蔵出版. ISBN 9784804305776 (in Japanese)
- Harada Waso (2010), An Annotated Translation of The Prajñaparamitahrdaya, Association of Esoteric Buddhist Studies, Vol.2002, No.209, pp. L17-L62 (in Japanese)
- Harada Waso (2017) 'A Partial English Summary of Harada Waso's works on The Heart Sūtra -- courtesy of Pat457'
- Karashima Seishi (2013). "The Meaning of 'Yulanpen 盂蘭盆' - 'Rice Bowl' on Pravāraṇā Day, Annual Report of The International Research Institute for Advance Buddhology at Soka University for the Academic Year 2012, Volume XVI, March 2013, pp 289-304.
- Li Xuezhu 李学竹 (2010). 中国梵文贝叶概况. (title tr to English: The State of Sanskrit Language Palm Leaf Manuscripts in China). 中国藏学 (journal title tr to English: China Tibetan Studies), pp 55-56 百度文库(in Chinese)
- Mizuno, Kogen (1982). Buddhist Sūtras: Origin, Development, Transmission. Tokyo: Kosei Publishing,
- Mochizuki, Shinko, Pruden, Leo M.; trans.; Pure Land Buddhism in China: A Doctrinal History, The Translation of Texts-Spurious Scriptures. In: Pacific World Journal, Third Series Number 3, Fall 2001, pp. 271-275
- Nadeau, Randall L. (1987). The "Decline of the Dharma" in Early Chinese Buddhism, Asian Review volume 1 (transl. of the "Scripture Preached by the Buddha on the Total Extinction of the Dharma")
- Nattier, Jan (1992). 'The Heart Sūtra: A Chinese Apocryphal Text?', Journal of the International Association of Buddhist Studies Vol. 15 (2), pp. 153-223
- Swanson, Paul (1998). Apocryphal Texts in Chinese Buddhism. T'ien-t'ai Chih-i's Use of Apocryphal Scriptures: In: Arie Van Debeek, Karel Van Der Toorn (eds.), Canonization and Decanonization, Leiden; Boston: Brill, ISBN 9004112464
- Skilling, Peter (2010). 'Scriptural Authenticity and the Śrāvaka Schools: An Essay towards an Indian Perspective, The Eastern Buddhist Vol. 41. No. 2, 1-48'
- Yamabe, Nobuyoshi (2002). 'Practice of Visualization and the Visualization Sutra : An Examination of Mural Paintings at Toyok, Turfan, Pacific World Third Series No. 4 Fall 2002, pp 123-152.
- Yang, Weizhong (2016). 《仁王般若经》的汉译及其“疑伪”之争 (title tr. to English: The Chinese Translation of "The Humane King Perfection of Wisdom Sutra" and Arguments Regarding its Suspicious or Apocryphal [Origins] 西南大学学报-人文社会科学版 (trans to English : Journal of Southwest University - Humanities and Social Science Edition), pp 81-86. (in Chinese)
- Yang, Weizhong (2016). 《圆觉经》的真伪之争新辨(title tr. to English: The New Analysis of the Authenticity of the 'Sutra of Perfect Enlightenment') 西北大学学报-哲学社会科学版 (trans to English : Journal of Northwest University - Philosophy and Social Science Edition), pp 35-40. 《圆觉经》的真伪之争新辨 (in Chinese)
