= Noël Péri =

French Catholic priest and missionary (1865–1922)

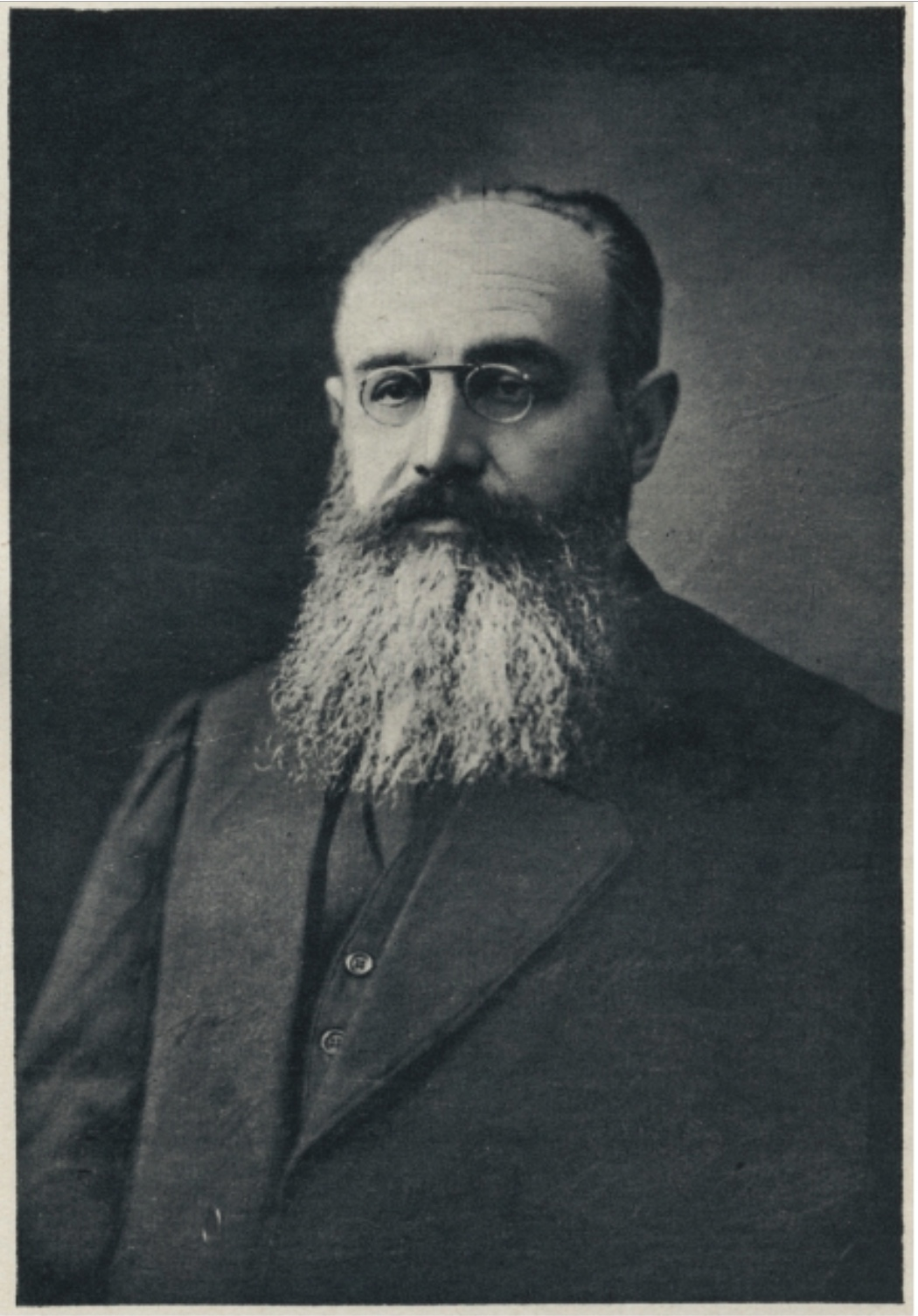
- Born: 22 August 1865; Cruzy-le-Châtel
- Died: 25 June 1922 (aged 56); Hanoi
- Occupations: Missionary, translator, author, priest
- Years active: 1888-1922
- Known for: translated the Gospels into Japanese; founded first foreign journal dedicated to Japanese topics

Noël Péri (French pronunciation: [nɔɛl peʁi]; 22 August 1865 - 25 June 1922) was a French Catholic priest. A missionary and author, he was responsible for translating the Gospels into Japanese and published the first research journal devoted to Japanese topics. He read and wrote broadly about Japanese culture, including studies of Buddhist history and mythology, and as a result came into conflict with some members of the Catholic missionary community. A trained musician, he also taught Western music in Japan and wrote early Western works on Japanese opera and music theory, and Noh drama.

== Biography ==
Noël Péri was born on 22 August 1865 in Cruzy-le-Châtel. He was ordained a priest in 1888 after being educated by the Jesuits. He spent four years serving in the Paris Foreign Missions Society, resigning from the Mission in 1902 but continuing to regularly return to Japan until shortly before his death in 1922.

Péri spent most of his first six years in Japan in Matsumoto, Nagano. During this period he translated two of the four Gospels into Japanese, and was briefly recalled to Tokyo to manage an orphanage. Around 1894 he relocated to Tokyo, where he ran a French bookstore and founded a Japanese-language magazine called Tenchijin ('Sky, Earth, and Man') that began to appear in 1898. Péri wrote about broad philosophical, metaphysical and moral issues but his inclination to avoid a narrowly Catholic or sectarian perspective created conflicts with more conservative elements of the Mission. This conflict led to Péri's departure from the Mission in 1902.

Péri briefly worked as a journalist in Shanghai and was a regular contributor to L'Écho de Chine, a French language newspaper, and occasional correspondent for l'Avenir du Tonkin.

During his time working as a translator and missionary in Japan, Péri became interested in Asian philosophy and made extensive studies of the Chinese Buddhist canon. In 1904, he organized the publication of Mélanges, (Mélanges japonais after 1907), a journal aimed at missionaries but publishing widely on historical, philosophical, and literary aspects of Japanese culture. Péri contributed summaries of recently published Japanese works that surveyed Buddhist canonical literature and mythology, contributing significantly to knowledge of the Buddhist canon in the Francophone world. Mélanges was the first foreign journal devoted to Japanese topics, and remained so for the first several years of its publication. However, in 1910 Catholic authorities- possibly the same faction that had previously disagreed with Péri's approach to Tenchijin- forced Mélanges japonais to suspend publication.

Péri was a trained musician and taught Western music at the Tokyo Conservatory of Music between 1896 and 1906. In addition to his teaching and other translation work, he published studies of Japanese opera and Noh in 1909 and 1912.

Péri was appointed to a residence at the École française d'Extrême-Orient in Hanoi in 1907, and served as secretary-librarian from 1911 until his death. He continued to write on topics in Asian history, Buddhist literature and myth, and Japanese culture. He wrote a comprehensive survey of various versions of the myth of the demonic/ogre goddess Hariti and examined her relationship with Guanyin, the East Asian form of Avalokitesvara. He also wrote about the deity Weituo, the historical dating of the commentator Vasubandhu, and the ambiguous identification of Gotama Buddha's wife, generally known as Yasodhara.

His unfinished manuscript on Japanese music theory and structure, Essai sur les gammes japonaises, was published posthumously.
