= Ānanda =

Attendant of the Buddha and main figure in First Buddhist Council

Venerable, the Elder (Thera) Ānanda
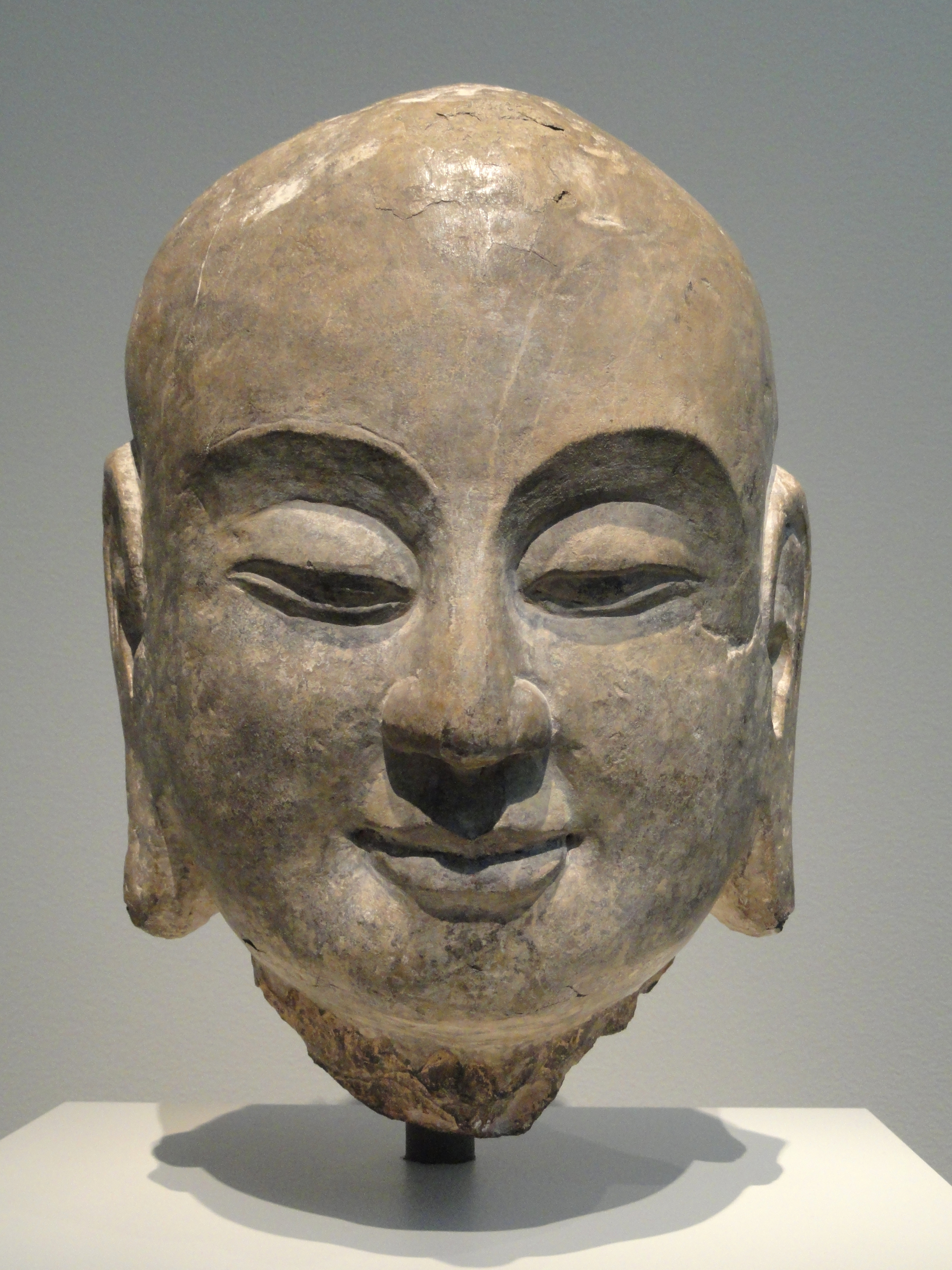
- Head of Ānanda, once part of a limestone sculpture from the northern Xiangtangshan Caves. Northern Qi dynasty, 550–577 CE.
- Title: Patriarch of the Dharma (Sanskrit traditions)

Personal life
- Born: 5th–4th century BCE Kapilavatthu
- Died: 20 years after the Buddha's death On the river Rohīni near Vesālī, or the Ganges
- Parent(s): King Śuklodana or King Amitodana; Queen Mrgī (Sanskrit traditions)
- Known for: Being an attendant of the Buddha (aggupaṭṭhāyaka); powers of memory; compassion to women
- Other names: Videhamuni; Dhamma-bhaṇḍāgārika ('Treasurer of the Dhamma')

Religious life
- Religion: Buddhism
- Consecration: Mahākassapa
- Initiation: 20th (Mūlasarvāstivāda) or 2nd (other traditions) year of the Buddha's ministry Nigrodhārāma or Anupiya, Malla by Daśabāla Kāśyapa or Belaṭṭhasīsa

Senior posting
- Teacher: The Buddha; Puṇṇa Mantānīputta
- Predecessor: Mahākassapa
- Successor: Majjhantika or Sāṇavāsī
- Students: Majjhantika; Sāṇavāsī, etc.

Ānanda (Pali and Sanskrit: आनंद; 5th–4th century BCE) was the primary attendant of the Buddha and one of his ten principal disciples. Among the Buddha's many disciples, Ānanda stood out for having the best memory. Most of the texts of the early Buddhist Sutta-Piṭaka (Pali: सुत्त पिटक; Sanskrit: सूत्र-पिटक, Sūtra-Piṭaka) are attributed to his recollection of the Buddha's teachings during the First Buddhist Council. For that reason, he is known as the Treasurer of the Dhamma, with Dhamma (Sanskrit: धर्म, dharma) referring to the Buddha's teaching. In Early Buddhist Texts, Ānanda was the first cousin of the Buddha. Although the early texts do not agree on many parts of Ānanda's early life, they do agree that Ānanda was ordained as a monk and that Puṇṇa Mantānīputta (Sanskrit: पूर्ण मैत्रायणीपुत्र, Pūrṇa Maitrāyaṇīputra) became his teacher. Twenty years in the Buddha's ministry, Ānanda became the attendant of the Buddha, when the Buddha selected him for this task. Ānanda performed his duties with great devotion and care, and acted as an intermediary between the Buddha and the laypeople, as well as the saṅgha (Sanskrit: संघ, romanized: saṃgha, lit. 'monastic community'). He accompanied the Buddha for the rest of his life, acting not only as an assistant, but also as a secretary and a mouthpiece.

Scholars are skeptical about the historicity of many events in Ānanda's life, especially the First Council, and consensus about this has yet to be established. A traditional account can be drawn from early texts, commentaries, and post-canonical chronicles. Ānanda had an important role in establishing the order of bhikkhunīs (Sanskrit: भिक्षुणी, romanized: bhikṣuṇī, lit. 'female mendicant'), when he requested the Buddha on behalf of the latter's foster-mother Mahāpajāpati Gotamī (Sanskrit: महाप्रजापती गौतमी, Mahāprajāpatī Gautamī) to allow her to be ordained. Ānanda also accompanied the Buddha in the last year of his life, and therefore was witness to many tenets and principles that the Buddha conveyed before his death, including the well-known principle that the Buddhist community should take his teaching and discipline as their refuge, and that he would not appoint a new leader. The final period of the Buddha's life also shows that Ānanda was very much attached to the Buddha's person, and he saw the Buddha's passing with great sorrow.

Shortly after the Buddha's death, the First Council was convened, and Ānanda managed to attain enlightenment just before the council started, which was a requirement. He had a historical role during the council as the living memory of the Buddha, reciting many of the Buddha's discourses and checking them for accuracy. During the same council, however, he was chastised by Mahākassapa (Sanskrit: महाकाश्यप, Mahākāśyapa) and the rest of the saṅgha for allowing women to be ordained and failing to understand or respect the Buddha at several crucial moments. Ānanda continued to teach until the end of his life, passing on his spiritual heritage to his pupils Sāṇavāsī (Sanskrit: शाणकवासी, Śāṇakavāsī) and Majjhantika (Sanskrit: मध्यान्तिक, Madhyāntika), among others, who later assumed leading roles in the Second and Third Councils. Ānanda died 20 years after the Buddha, and stūpas (monuments) were erected at the river where he died.

Ānanda is one of the most loved figures in Buddhism. He was widely known for his memory, erudition and compassion, and was often praised by the Buddha for these matters. He functioned as a foil to the Buddha, however, in that he still had worldly attachments and was not yet enlightened, as opposed to the Buddha. In the Sanskrit textual traditions, Ānanda is considered the patriarch of the Dhamma who stood in a spiritual lineage, receiving the teaching from Mahākassapa and passing them on to his own pupils. Ānanda has been honored by bhikkhunīs since early medieval times for his merits in establishing the nun's order. In recent times, the composer Richard Wagner and Indian poet Rabindranath Tagore were inspired by stories about Ānanda in their work.

== Name ==
The word ānanda (आनंद) means 'bliss, joy' in Pāli and in Sanskrit. Pāli commentaries explain that when Ānanda was born, his relatives were joyous about this. Texts from the Mūlasarvāstivāda tradition, however, state that since Ānanda was born on the day of the Buddha's enlightenment, there was great rejoicing in the city—hence the name.

== Accounts ==
=== Previous lives ===
According to the texts, in a previous life, Ānanda made an aspiration to become a Buddha's attendant. He made this aspiration in the time of a previous Buddha called Padumuttara, many eons (Pali: kappa, Sanskrit: kalpa) before the present age. He met the attendant of Padumuttara Buddha and aspired to be like him in a future life. After having done many good deeds, he made his resolution known to the Padumuttara Buddha, who confirmed that his wish will come true in a future life. After having been born and reborn throughout many lifetimes, and doing many good deeds, he was born as Ānanda in the time of the current Buddha Gotama.

=== Early life ===
Map of India, c. 500 BCE

Ānanda was born in the same time period as the Buddha (formerly Prince Siddhattha), which scholars place at 5th–4th centuries BCE. Tradition says that Ānanda was the first cousin of the Buddha, his father being the brother of Suddhodana (Sanskrit: Śuddhodana), the Buddha's father. In the Pāli and Mūlasarvāstivāda textual traditions, his father was Amitodana (Sanskrit: Amṛtodana), but the Mahāvastu states that his father was Śuklodana—both are brothers of Suddhodana. The Mahāvastu also mentions that Ānanda's mother's name was Mṛgī (Sanskrit; lit. 'little deer'; Pāli is unknown). The Pāli tradition has it that Ānanda was born on the same day as Prince Siddhatta (Sanskrit: Siddhārtha), but texts from the Mūlasarvāstivāda and subsequent Mahāyāna traditions state Ānanda was born at the same time the Buddha attained enlightenment (when Prince Siddhattha was 35 years old), and was therefore much younger than the Buddha. The latter tradition is corroborated by several instances in the Early Buddhist Texts, in which Ānanda appears younger than the Buddha, such as the passage in which the Buddha explained to Ānanda how old age was affecting him in body and mind. It is also corroborated by a verse in the Pāli text called Theragāthā, in which Ānanda stated he was a "learner" (sekha) for 25 years, after which he attended to the Buddha for another 25 years.

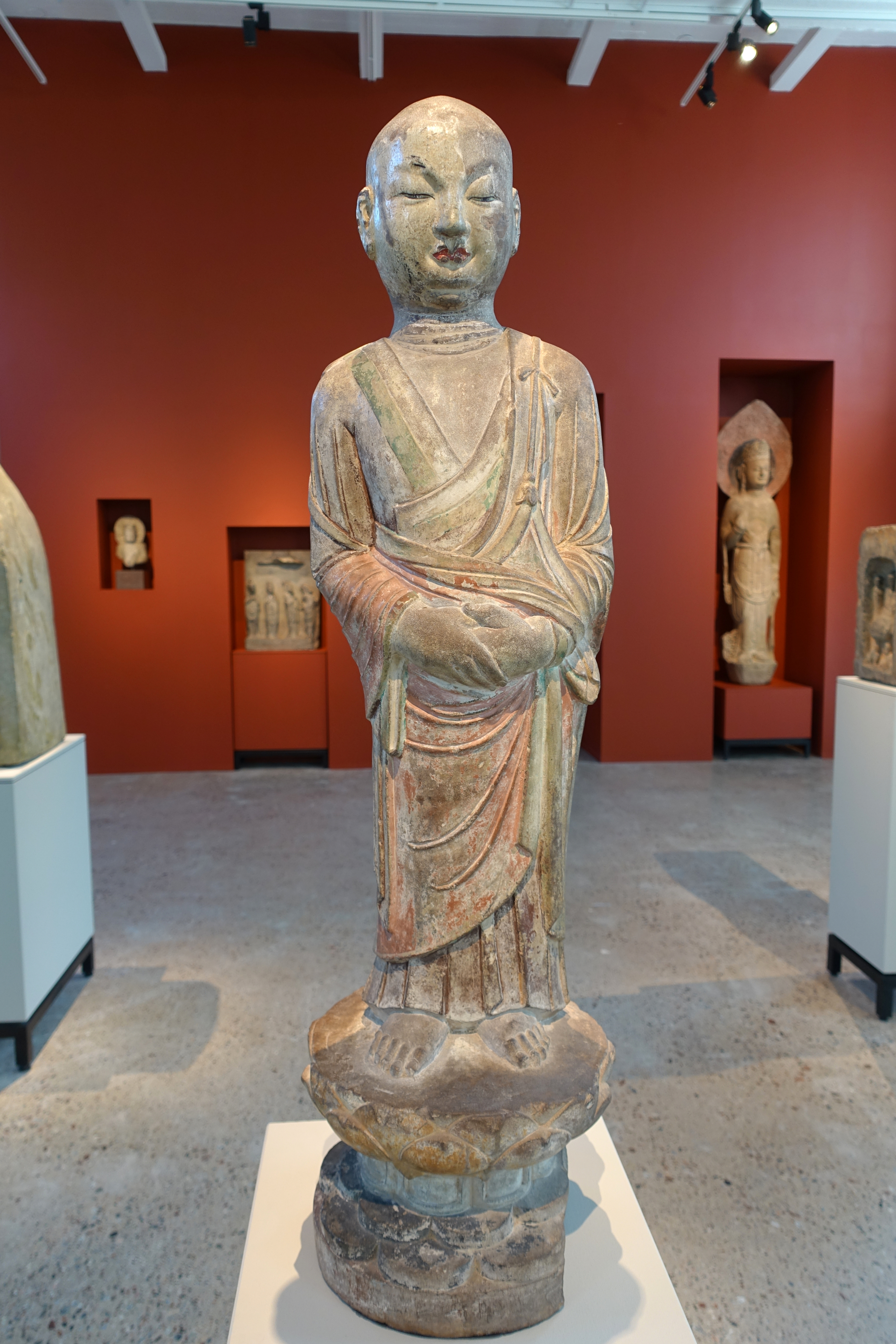
Chinese statue, identified as likely being Ānanda

Following the Pāli, Mahīśasaka and Dharmaguptaka textual traditions, Ānanda became a monk in the second year of the Buddha's ministry, during the Buddha's visit to Kapilavatthu (Sanskrit: Kapilavastu). He was ordained by the Buddha himself, together with many other princes of the Buddha's clan (Pali: Sākiya, Sanskrit: Śākya), in the mango grove called Anupiya, part of Malla territory. According to a text from the Mahāsaṅghika tradition, King Suddhodana wanted the Buddha to have more followers of the khattiya caste (Sanskrit: kṣatriyaḥ, lit. 'warrior-noble, member of the ruling class'), and less from the brahmin (priest) caste. He therefore ordered that any khattiya who had a brother to follow the Buddha as a monk, or have his brother do so. Ānanda used this opportunity, and asked his brother Devadatta to stay at home, so that he could leave for the monkhood. The later timeline from the Mūlasarvāstivāda texts and the Pāli Theragāthā, however, have Ānanda ordain much later, about twenty-five years before the Buddha's death—in other words, twenty years in the Buddha's ministry. Some Sanskrit sources have him ordain even later. The Mūlasarvāstivāda texts on monastic discipline (Pāli and Sanskrit: Vinaya) relate that soothsayers predicted Ānanda would be the Buddha's attendant. In order to prevent Ānanda from leaving the palace to ordain, his father brought him to Vesālī (Sanskrit: Vaiśālī) during the Buddha's visit to Kapilavatthu, but later the Buddha met and taught Ānanda nonetheless. On a similar note, the Mahāvastu relates, however, that Mṛgī was initially opposed to Ānanda joining the holy life, because his brother Devadatta had already ordained and left the palace. Ānanda responded to his mother's resistance by moving to Videha (Sanskrit: Vaideha) and lived there, taking a vow of silence. This led him to gain the epithet Videhamuni (Sanskrit: Vaidehamuni), meaning 'the silent wise one from Videha'. When Ānanda did become ordained, his father had him ordain in Kapilavatthu in the Nigrodhārāma monastery (Sanskrit: Niyagrodhārāma) with much ceremony, Ānanda's preceptor (Pali: upajjhāya; Sanskrit: upādhyāya) being a certain Daśabāla Kāśyapa.

According to the Pāli tradition, Ānanda's first teachers were Belaṭṭhasīsa and Puṇṇa Mantānīputta. It was Puṇṇa's teaching that led Ānanda to attain the stage of sotāpanna (Sanskrit: śrotāpanna), an attainment preceding that of enlightenment. Ānanda later expressed his debt to Puṇṇa. Another important figure in the life of Ānanda was Sāriputta (Sanskrit: Śāriputra), one of the Buddha's main disciples. Sāriputta often taught Ānanda about the finer points of Buddhist doctrine; they were in the habit of sharing things with one another, and their relationship is described as a good friendship. In some Mūlasarvāstivāda texts, an attendant of Ānanda is also mentioned who helped motivate Ānanda when he was banned from the First Buddhist Council. He was a "Vajjiputta" (Sanskrit: Vṛjjiputra), i.e. someone who originated from the Vajji confederacy. According to later texts, an enlightened monk also called Vajjiputta (Sanskrit: Vajraputra) had an important role in Ānanda's life. He listened to a teaching of Ānanda and realized that Ānanda was not enlightened yet. Vajjiputta encouraged Ānanda to talk less to laypeople and deepen his meditation practice by retreating in the forest, advice that very much affected Ānanda.

=== Attending to the Buddha ===
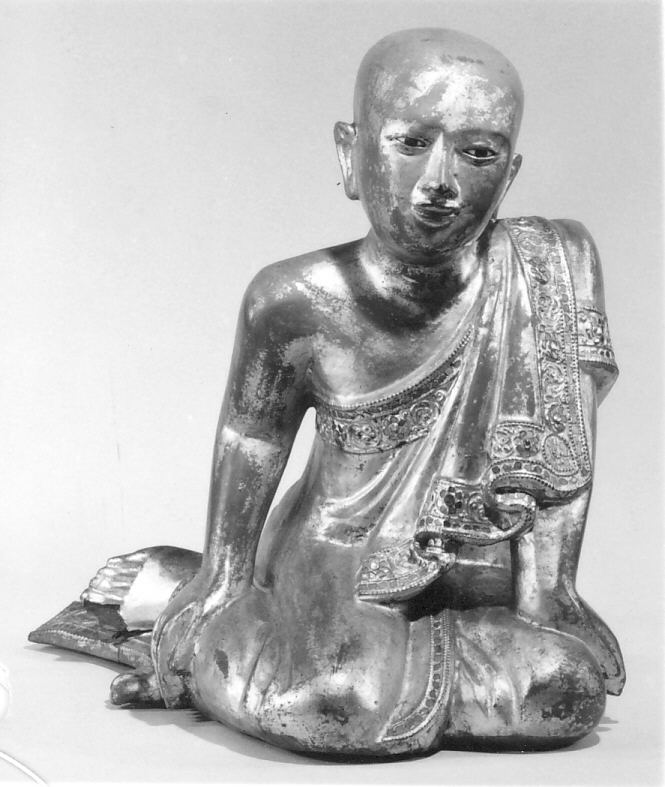
18th-century Burmese sculpture of Ānanda

In the first twenty years of the Buddha's ministry, the Buddha had several personal attendants. However, after these twenty years, when the Buddha was aged 55, (Note: According to Mūlasarvāstivāda tradition, the Buddha was 50.) the Buddha announced that he had need for a permanent attendant. The Buddha had been growing older, and his previous attendants had not done their job very well. Initially, several of the Buddha's foremost disciples responded to his request, but the Buddha did not accept them. All the while Ānanda remained quiet. When he was asked why, he said that the Buddha would know best whom to choose, upon which the Buddha responded by choosing Ānanda. (Note: According to the Mūlasarvāstivāda tradition, Ānanda was born at the same time the Buddha became enlightened, and was therefore younger than the other leading disciples. The reason that the other disciples were not chosen may be because they were too old for the task.) Ānanda agreed to take on the position, on the condition that he did not receive any material benefits from the Buddha. Accepting such benefits would open him up to criticism that he chose the position because of ulterior motives. He also requested that the Buddha allow him to accept invitations on his behalf, allow him to ask questions about his doctrine, and repeat any teaching that the Buddha had taught in Ānanda's absence. These requests would help people trust Ānanda and show that the Buddha was sympathetic to his attendant. Furthermore, Ānanda considered these the real advantages of being an attendant, which is why he requested them.

The Buddha agreed to Ānanda's conditions, and Ānanda became the Buddha's attendant, accompanying the Buddha on most of his wanderings. Ānanda took care of the Buddha's daily practical needs, by doing things such as bringing water and cleaning the Buddha's dwelling place. He is depicted as observant and devoted, even guarding the dwelling place at night. Ānanda takes the part of interlocutor in many of the recorded dialogues. He tended the Buddha for a total of 25 years, a duty which entailed much work. His relationship with the Buddha is depicted as warm and trusting: when the Buddha grew ill, Ānanda had a sympathetic illness; when the Buddha grew older, Ānanda kept taking care of him with devotion.

Ānanda sometimes literally risked his life for his teacher. At one time, the rebellious monk Devadatta tried to kill the Buddha by having a drunk and wild elephant released in the Buddha's presence. Ānanda stepped in front of the Buddha to protect him. When the Buddha told him to move, he refused, although normally he always obeyed the Buddha. Through a supernatural accomplishment (Pali: iddhi; Sanskrit: ṛiddhi) the Buddha then moved Ānanda aside and subdued the elephant, by touching it and speaking to it with loving-kindness.

Ānanda often acted as an intermediary and secretary, passing on messages from the Buddha, informing the Buddha of news, invitations, or the needs of lay people, and advising lay people who wanted to provide gifts to the saṅgha. At one time, Mahāpajāpatī, the Buddha's foster-mother, requested to offer robes for personal use for the Buddha. She said that even though she had raised the Buddha in his youth, she never gave anything in person to the young prince; she now wished to do so. The Buddha initially insisted that she give the robe to the community as a whole rather than to be attached to his person. However, Ānanda interceded and mediated, suggesting that the Buddha had better accept the robe. Eventually the Buddha did, but not without pointing out to Ānanda that good deeds like giving should always be done for the sake of the action itself, not for the sake of the person.

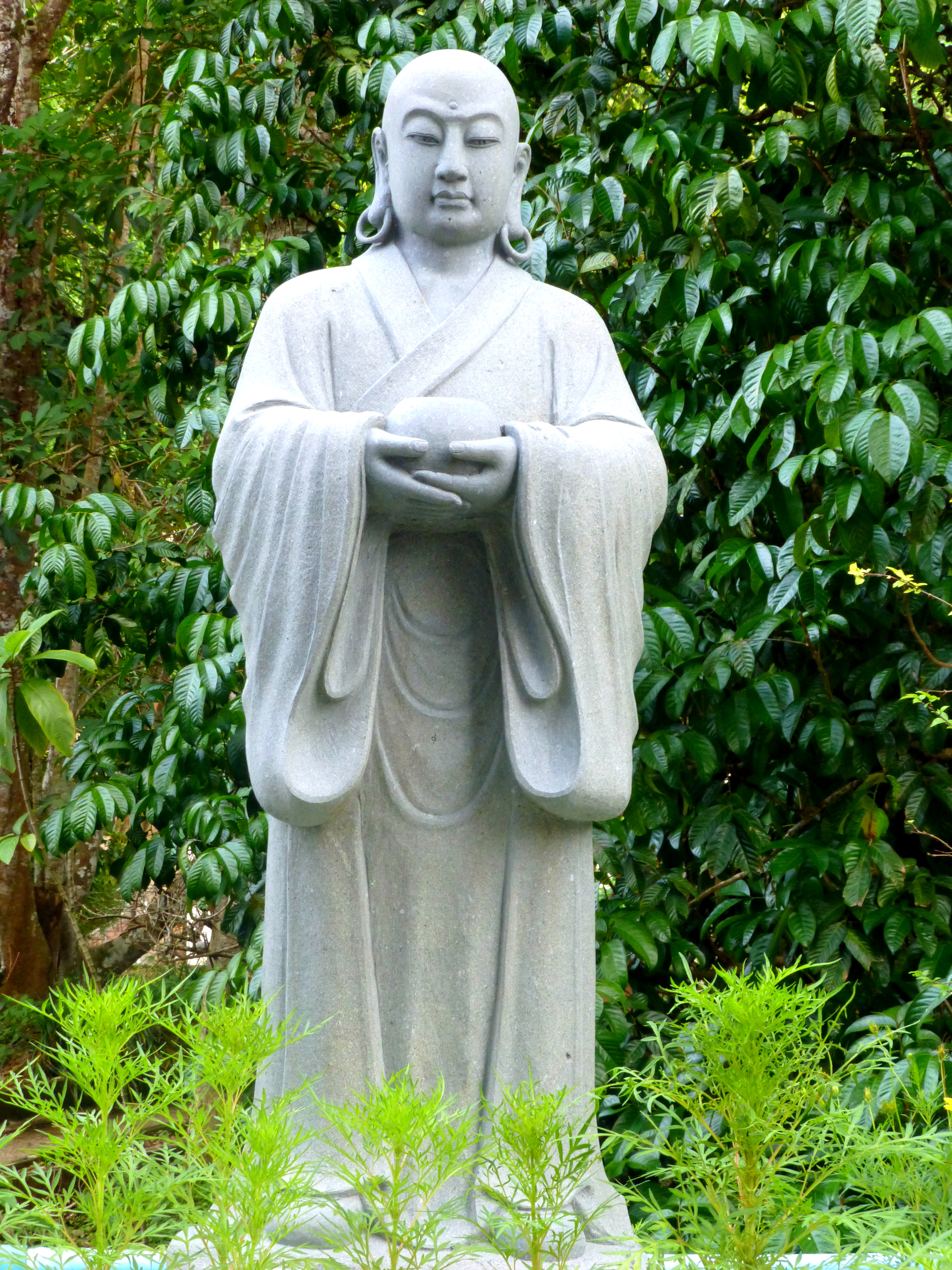
Sculpture of Ānanda from Wat Khao Rup Chang, Songkhla, Thailand

The texts say that the Buddha sometimes asked Ānanda to substitute for him as teacher, and was often praised by the Buddha for his teachings. Ānanda was often given important teaching roles, such as regularly teaching Queen Mallikā, Queen Sāmāvatī, (Sanskrit: Śyāmāvatī) and other people from the ruling class. Once Ānanda taught a number of King Udena (Sanskrit: Udayana)'s concubines. They were so impressed by Ānanda's teaching, that they gave him five hundred robes, which Ānanda accepted. Having heard about this, King Udena criticized Ānanda for being greedy; Ānanda responded by explaining how every single robe was carefully used, reused and recycled by the monastic community, prompting the king to offer another five hundred robes. Ānanda also had a role in the Buddha's visit to Vesālī. In this story, the Buddha taught the well-known text Ratana Sutta to Ānanda, which Ānanda then recited in Vesālī, ridding the city from illness, drought and evil spirits in the process. Another well-known passage in which the Buddha taught Ānanda is the passage about spiritual friendship (Pali: kalyāṇamittata). In this passage, Ānanda stated that spiritual friendship is half of the holy life; the Buddha corrected Ānanda, stating that such friendship is the entire holy life. In summary, Ānanda worked as an assistant, intermediary and a mouthpiece, helping the Buddha in many ways, and learning his teachings in the process.

==== Resisting temptations ====
Ānanda was attractive in appearance. A Pāli account related that a bhikkhunī (nun) became enamored with Ānanda, and pretended to be ill to have Ānanda visit her. When she realized the error of her ways, she confessed her mistakes to Ānanda. Other accounts relate that a low-caste woman called Prakṛti (also known in China as 摩登伽女; Módēngqiénǚ) fell in love with Ānanda, and persuaded her mother Mātaṅgī to use a black magic spell to enchant him. This succeeded, and Ānanda was lured into her house, but came to his senses and called upon the help of the Buddha. The Buddha then taught Prakṛti to reflect on the repulsive qualities of the human body, and eventually Prakṛti was ordained as a bhikkhunī, giving up her attachment for Ānanda. In an East Asian version of the story in the Śūraṃgama sūtra, the Buddha sent Mañjuśrī to help Ānanda, who used recitation to counter the magic charm. The Buddha then continued by teaching Ānanda and other listeners about the Buddha nature.

=== Establishing the nun's order ===
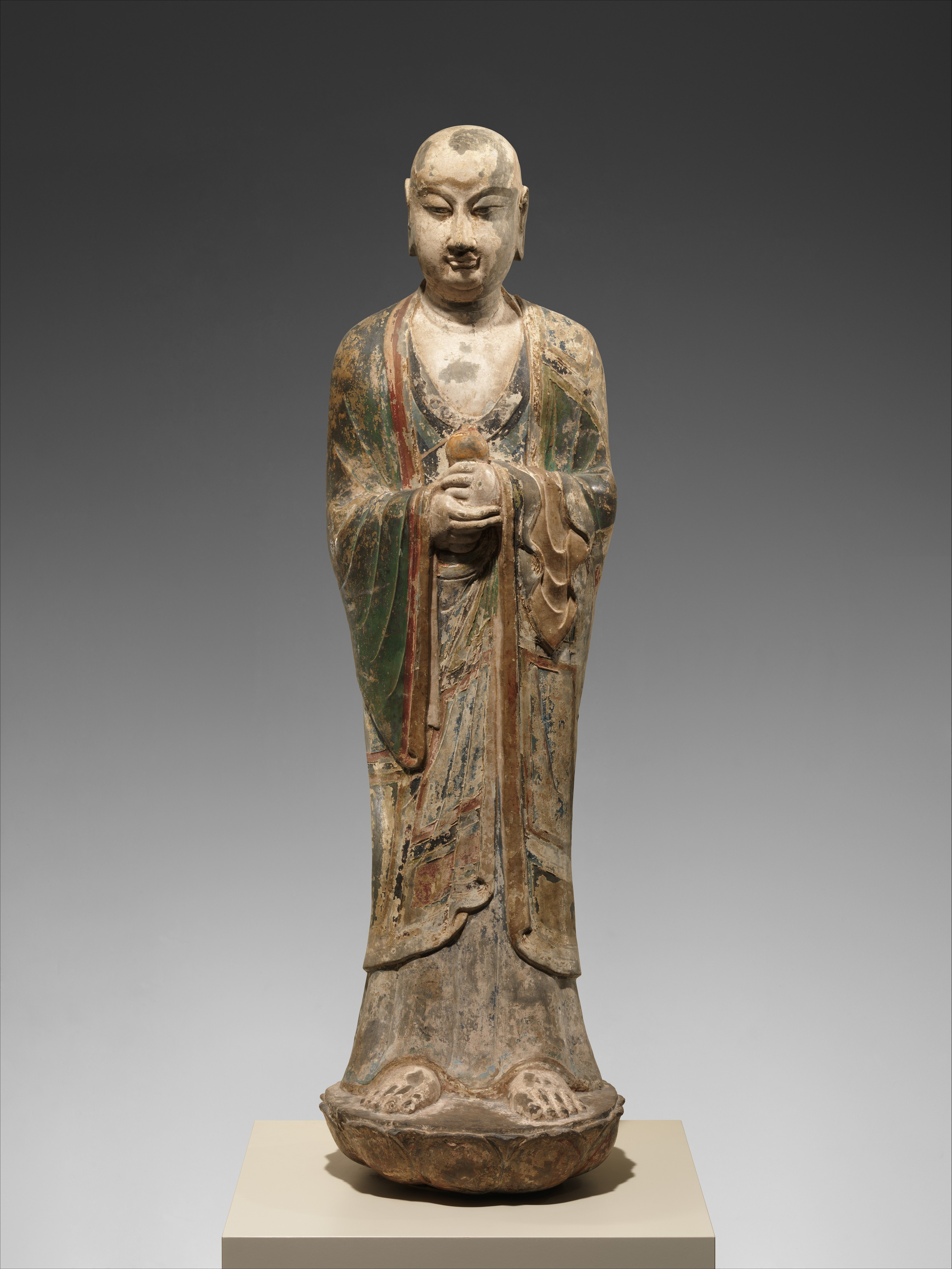
8th-century Chinese limestone sculpture of Ānanda

In the role of mediator between the Buddha and the lay communities, Ānanda sometimes made suggestions to the Buddha for amendments in the monastic discipline. Most importantly, the early texts attribute the inclusion of women in the early saṅgha (monastic order) to Ānanda. Fifteen years after the Buddha's enlightenment, his foster mother Mahāpajāpatī came to see him to ask him to be ordained as the first Buddhist bhikkhunī. Initially, the Buddha refused this. Five years later, Mahāpajāpatī came to request the Buddha again, this time with a following of other Sākiya women, including the Buddha's former wife Yasodharā (Sanskrit: Yaśodarā). They had walked 500 kilometres (310 miles), looked dirty, tired and depressed, and Ānanda felt pity for them. Ānanda therefore confirmed with the Buddha whether women could become enlightened as well. Although the Buddha conceded this, he did not allow the Sākiya women to be ordained yet. Ānanda then discussed with the Buddha how Mahāpajāpatī took care of him during his childhood, after the death of his real mother. Ānanda also mentioned that previous Buddhas had also ordained bhikkhunīs. In the end, the Buddha allowed the Sākiya women to be ordained, being the start of the bhikkhunī order. Ānanda had Mahāpajāpati ordained by her acceptance of a set of rules, set by the Buddha. These came to be known as the garudhamma, and they describe the subordinate relation of the bhikkhunī community to that of the bhikkhus or monks. Scholar of Asian religions Reiko Ohnuma argues that the debt the Buddha had toward his foster-mother Mahāpajāpati may have been the main reason for his concessions with regard to the establishment of a bhikkhunī order.

Many scholars interpret this account to mean that the Buddha was reluctant in allowing women to be ordained, and that Ānanda successfully persuaded the Buddha to change his mind. For example, Indologist and translator I.B. Horner wrote that "this is the only instance of his [the Buddha] being over-persuaded in argument". However, some scholars interpret the Buddha's initial refusal rather as a test of resolve, following a widespread pattern in the Pāli Canon and in monastic procedure of repeating a request three times before final acceptance. Some also argue that the Buddha was believed by Buddhists to be omniscient, and therefore is unlikely to have been depicted as changing his mind. Other scholars argue that other passages in the texts indicate the Buddha intended all along to establish a bhikkhunī order. Regardless, during the acceptance of women into the monastic order, the Buddha told Ānanda that the Buddha's Dispensation would last shorter because of this. At the time, the Buddhist monastic order consisted of wandering celibate males, without many monastic institutions. Allowing women to join the Buddhist celibate life might have led to dissension, as well as temptation between the sexes. The garudhamma, however, were meant to fix these problems, and prevent the dispensation from being curtailed.

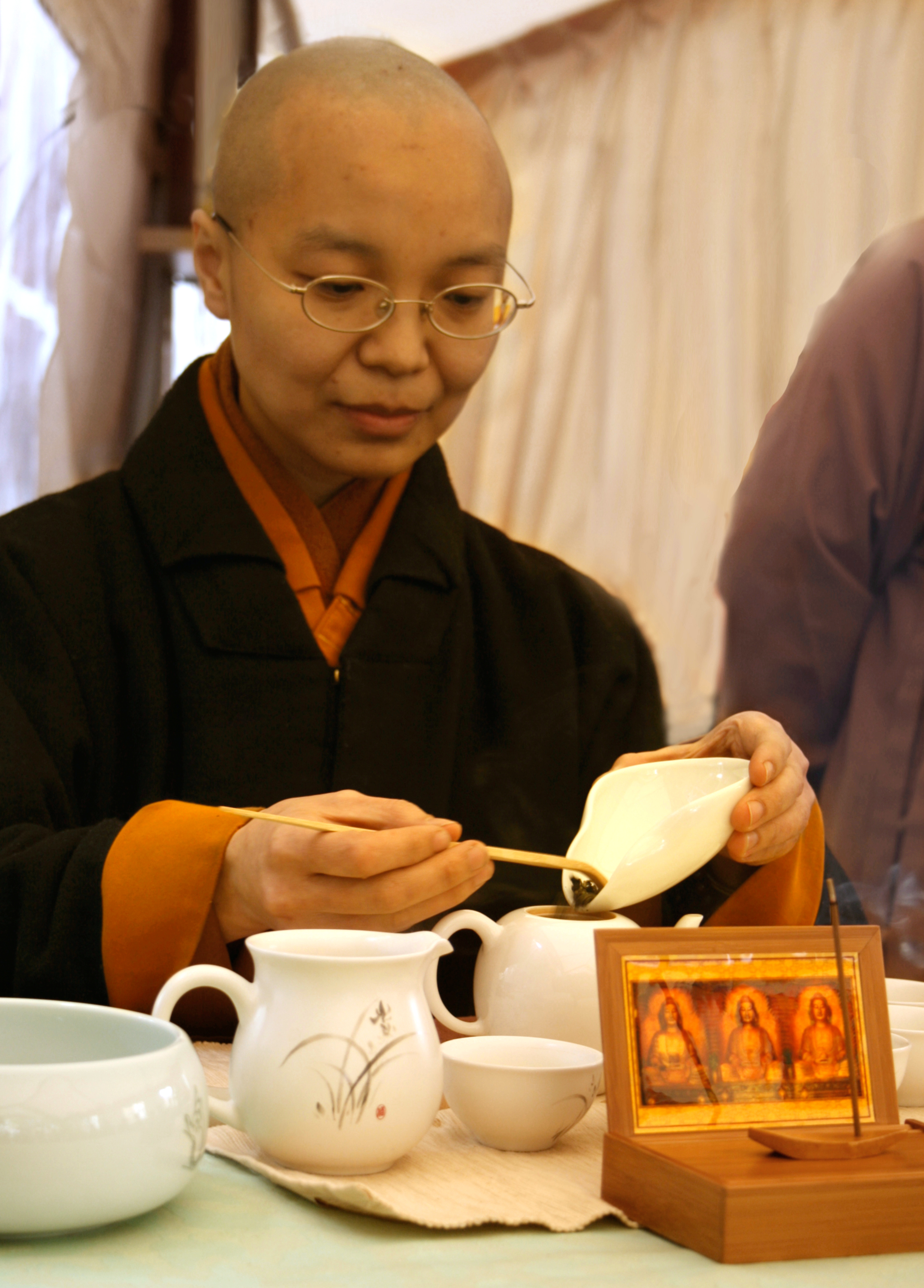
The early texts attribute the inclusion of women in the early monastic order to Ānanda.

There are some chronological discrepancies in the traditional account of the setting up of the bhikkhunī order. According to the Pāli and Mahīśasaka textual traditions, the bhikkhunī order was set up five years after the Buddha's enlightenment, but, according to most textual traditions, Ānanda only became attendant twenty years after the Buddha's enlightenment. Furthermore, Mahāpajāpati was the Buddha's foster mother, and must therefore have been considerably older than him. However, after the bhikkhunī order was established, Mahāpajāpati still had many audiences with the Buddha, as reported in Pāli and Chinese Early Buddhist Texts. Because of this and other reasons, it could be inferred that establishment of the bhikkhunī order actually took place early in the Buddha's ministry. If this is the case, Ānanda's role in establishing the order becomes less likely. Some scholars therefore interpret the names in the account, such as Ānanda and Mahāpajāpati, as symbols, representing groups rather than specific individuals.

According to the texts, Ānanda's role in founding the bhikkhunī order made him popular with the bhikkhunī community. Ānanda often taught bhikkhunīs, often encouraged women to ordain, and when he was criticized by the monk Mahākassapa, several bhikkhunīs tried to defend him. According to Indologist Oskar von Hinüber, Ānanda's pro-bhikkhunī attitude may well be the reason why there was frequent discussion between Ānanda and Mahākassapa, eventually leading Mahākasapa to charge Ānanda with several offenses during the First Buddhist Council. Von Hinüber further argues that the establishment of the bhikkhunī order may have well been initiated by Ānanda after the Buddha's death, and the introduction of Mahāpajāpati as the person requesting to do so is merely a literary device to connect the ordination of women with the person of the Buddha, through his foster mother. Von Hinüber concludes this based on several patterns in the early texts, including the apparent distance between the Buddha and the bhikkhunī order, and the frequent discussions and differences of opinion that take place between Ānanda and Mahākassapa. Some scholars have seen merits in von Hinüber's argument with regard to the pro- and anti-factions, but as of 2017, no definitive evidence has been found for the theory of establishment of the bhikkhuni order after the Buddha's death. Buddhist studies scholar Bhikkhu Anālayo has responded to most of von Hinuber's arguments, writing: "Besides requiring too many assumptions, this hypothesis conflicts with nearly 'all the evidence preserved in the texts together'", (Note: Anālayo cites von Hinüber with this phrase.) arguing that it was monastic discipline that created a distance between the Buddha and the bhikkhunīs, and even so, there were many places in the early texts where the Buddha did address bhikkhunīs directly.

=== Buddha's death ===
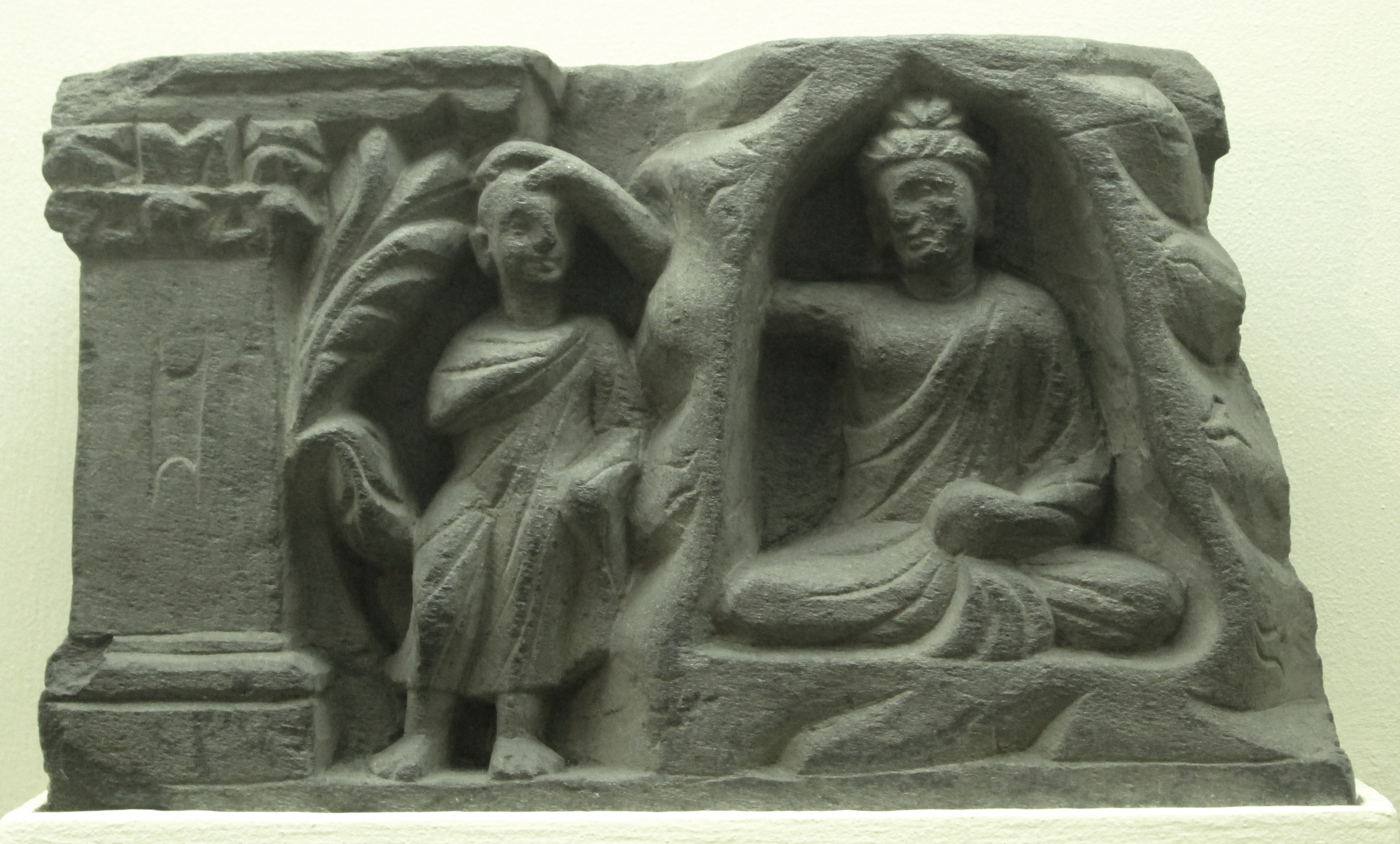
Sculpture at Vulture Peak, Rajgir, India, depicting the Buddha consoling Ānanda

Despite his long association with and close proximity to the Buddha, the texts describe that Ānanda had not become enlightened yet. Because of that, a fellow monk Udāyī (Sanskrit: Udāyin) ridiculed Ānanda. However, the Buddha reprimanded Udāyī in response, saying that Ānanda would certainly be enlightened in this life.

The Pāli Mahā-parinibbāna Sutta related the last year-long trip the Buddha took with Ānanda from Rājagaha (Sanskrit: Rājagṛha) to the small town of Kusinārā (Sanskrit: Kuśinagara) before the Buddha died there. Before reaching Kusinārā, the Buddha spent the retreat during the monsoon (Pali: vassa, Sanskrit: varṣā) in Veḷugāma (Sanskrit: Veṇugrāmaka), getting out of the Vesālī area which suffered from famine. Here, the eighty-year old Buddha expressed his wish to speak to the saṅgha once more. The Buddha had grown seriously ill in Vesālī, much to the concern of some of his disciples. Ānanda understood that the Buddha wished to leave final instructions before his death. The Buddha stated, however, that he had already taught everything needed, without withholding anything secret as a teacher with a "closed fist" would. He also impressed upon Ānanda that he did not think the saṅgha should be reliant too much on a leader, not even himself. He then continued with the well-known statement to take his teaching as a refuge, and oneself as a refuge, without relying on any other refuge, also after he would be gone. Bareau argued that this is one of the most ancient parts of the text, found in slight variation in five early textual traditions:

"Moreover, this very beautiful episode, touching with nobility and psychological verisimilitude with regard to both Ānanda and the Buddha, seems to go back very far, at the time when the authors, like the other disciples, still considered the Blessed One [the Buddha] a man, an eminently respectable and undefiled master, to whom behavior and utterly human words were lent, so that one is even tempted to see there the memory of a real scene which Ānanda reportedly told to the Community in the months following the Parinirvāṇa [death of the Buddha]."

The same text contains an account in which the Buddha, at numerous occasions, gave a hint that he could prolong his life to a full eon through a supernatural accomplishment, but this was a power that he would have to be asked to exercise. (Note: There was some debate between the early Buddhist schools as to what eon means in this context, some schools arguing it meant a full human lifespan, others that an enlightened being was capable of producing a "new life-span by the sole power of his meditation".) Ānanda was distracted, however, and did not take the hint. Later, Ānanda did make the request, but the Buddha replied that it was already too late, as he would die soon. Māra, the Buddhist personification of evil, had visited the Buddha, and the Buddha had decided to die in three months. When Ānanda heard this, he wept. The Buddha consoled him, however, pointing out that Ānanda had been a great attendant, being sensitive to the needs of different people. If he was earnest in his efforts, he would attain enlightenment soon. He then pointed out to Ānanda that all conditioned things are impermanent: all people must die. (Note: According to John Powers, the Buddha only left Vesālī at this point, and not earlier.)

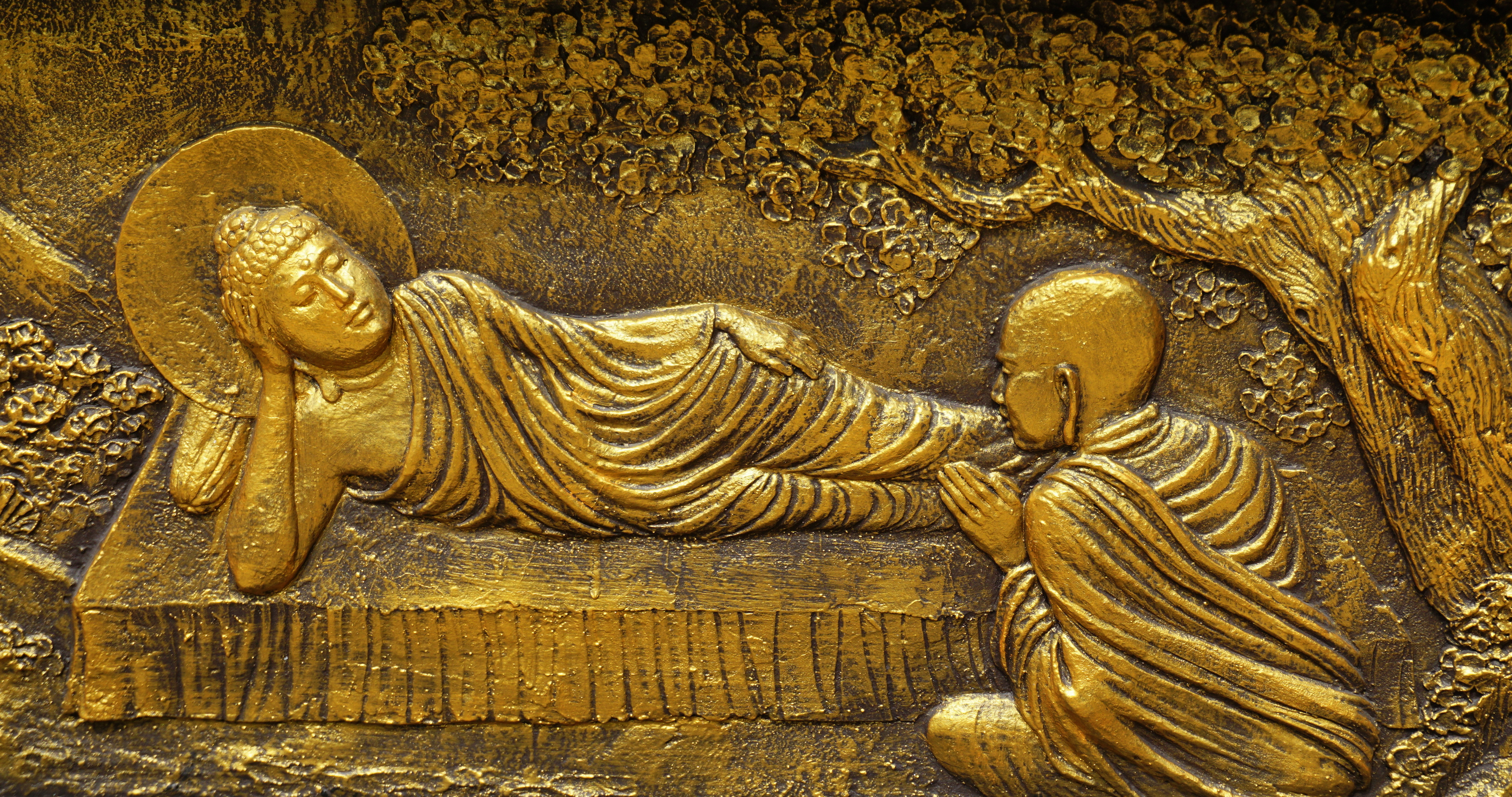
East Javanese relief depicting the Buddha in his final days, and Ānanda

In the final days of the Buddha's life, the Buddha traveled to Kusinārā. The Buddha had Ānanda prepare a place for lying down between two sal trees, the same type of tree under which the mother of the Buddha gave birth. The Buddha then had Ānanda invite the Malla clan from Kusinārā to pay their final respects. Having returned, Ānanda asked the Buddha what should be done with his body after his death, and he replied that it should be cremated, giving detailed instructions on how this should be done. Since the Buddha prohibited Ānanda from being involved himself, but rather had him instruct the Mallas to perform the rituals, these instructions have by many scholars been interpreted as a prohibition that monastics should not be involved in funerals or worship of stūpas (structures with relics). Buddhist studies scholar Gregory Schopen has pointed out, however, that this prohibition only held for Ānanda, and only with regard to the Buddha's funeral ceremony. It has also been shown that the instructions on the funeral are quite late in origin, in both composition and insertion into the text, and are not found in parallel texts, apart from the Mahāparinibbāna Sutta. Ānanda then continued by asking how devotees should honor the Buddha after his death. The Buddha responded by listing four important places in his life that people could pay their respects to, which later became the four main places of Buddhist pilgrimage. Before the Buddha died, Ānanda recommended the Buddha to move to a more meaningful city instead, but the Buddha pointed out that the town was once a great capital. Ānanda then asked who will be next teacher after the Buddha would be gone, but the Buddha replied that his teaching and discipline would be the teacher instead. This meant that decisions should be made by reaching consensus within the saṅgha, and more generally, that now the time had come for the Buddhist monastics and devotees to take the Buddhist texts as authority, now that the Buddha was dying.

The Buddha gave several instructions before his death, including a directive that his former charioteer Channa (Sanskrit: Chandaka) be shunned by his fellow monks, to humble his pride. In his final moments, the Buddha asked if anyone had any questions they wished to pose to him, as a final chance to allay any doubts. When no-one responded, Ānanda expressed joy that all of the Buddha's disciples present had attained a level beyond doubts about the Buddha's teaching. However, the Buddha pointed out that Ānanda spoke out of faith and not out of meditative insight—a final reproach. The Buddha added that, of all the five hundred monks that are surrounding him now, even the "latest" or "most backward" (Pali: pacchimaka) had attained the initial stage of sotapanna. Meant as an encouragement, the Buddha was referring to Ānanda. During the Buddha's final Nirvana, Anuruddha was able to use his meditative powers to understand which stages the Buddha underwent before attaining final Nirvana. However, Ānanda was unable to do so, indicating his lesser spiritual maturity. After the Buddha's death, Ānanda recited several verses, expressing a sense of urgency (Pali: saṃvega), deeply moved by the events and their bearing: "Terrible was the quaking, men's hair stood on end, / When the all-accomplished Buddha passed away."

Shortly after the council, Ānanda brought the message with regard to the Buddha's directive to Channa personally. Channa was humbled and changed his ways, attained enlightenment, and the penalty was withdrawn by the saṅgha. Ānanda traveled to Sāvatthī (Sanskrit: Śrāvastī), where he was met with a sad populace, who he consoled with teachings on impermanence. After that, Ānanda went to the quarters of the Buddha and went through the motions of the routine he formerly performed when the Buddha was still alive, such as preparing water and cleaning the quarters. He then saluted and talked to the quarters as though the Buddha was still there. The Pāli commentaries state that Ānanda did this out of devotion, but also because he was "not yet free from the passions".

=== First Council ===
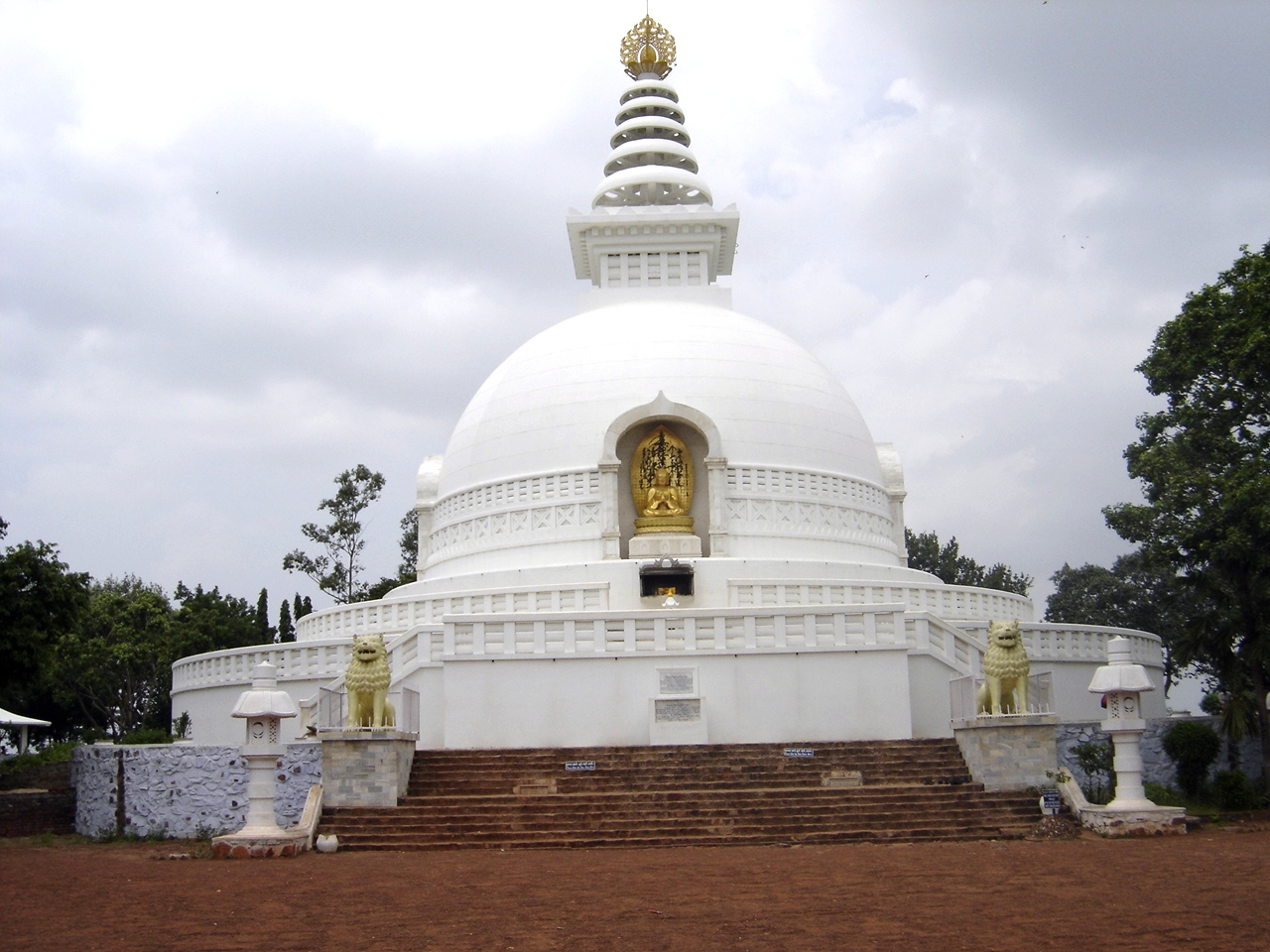
According to Buddhist texts, the First Buddhist Council was held in Rājagaha.

==== Ban ====
According to the texts, the First Buddhist Council was held in Rājagaha. In the first vassa after the Buddha had died, the presiding monk Mahākassapa (Sanskrit: Mahākāśyapa) called upon Ānanda to recite the discourses he had heard, as a representative on this council. (Note: This is the most well-known version of the account. However, the texts of the Sarvāstivāda, Mūlasarvāstivāda, and Mahīśāsaka traditions relate that this was Añña Koṇḍañña (Sanskrit: Ājñāta Kauṇḍinya) instead, as Koṇḍañña was the most senior disciple.) There was a rule issued that only enlightened disciples (arahants) were allowed to attend the council, to prevent mental afflictions from clouding the disciples' memories. Ānanda had, however, not attained enlightenment yet, in contrast with the rest of the council, consisting of 499 arahants. Mahākassapa therefore did not allow Ānanda to attend yet. Although he knew that Ānanda's presence in the council was required, he did not want to be biased by allowing an exception to the rule. The Mūlasarvāstivāda tradition adds that Mahākassapa initially allowed Ānanda to join as a sort of servant assisting during the council, but then was forced to remove him when the disciple Anuruddha saw that Ānanda was not yet enlightened.

Ānanda felt humiliated, but was prompted to focus his efforts to reach enlightenment before the council started. The Mūlasarvāstivāda texts add that he felt motivated when he remembered the Buddha's words that he should be his own refuge, and when he was consoled and advised by Anuruddha and Vajjiputta, the latter being his attendant. On the night before the event, he tried hard to attain enlightenment. After a while, Ānanda took a break and decided to lie down for a rest. He then attained enlightenment right there, right then, halfway between standing and lying down. Thus, Ānanda was known as the disciple who attained awakening "in none of the four traditional poses" (walking, standing, sitting, or lying down). The next morning, to prove his enlightenment, Ānanda performed a supernatural accomplishment by diving into the earth and appearing on his seat at the council (or, according to some sources, by flying through the air). Scholars such as Buddhologist André Bareau and scholar of religion Ellison Banks Findly have been skeptical about many details in this account, including the number of participants on the council, and the account of Ānanda's enlightenment just before the council. Regardless, today, the story of Ānanda's struggle on the evening before the council is still told among Buddhists as a piece of advice in the practice of meditation: neither to give up, nor to interpret the practice too rigidly.

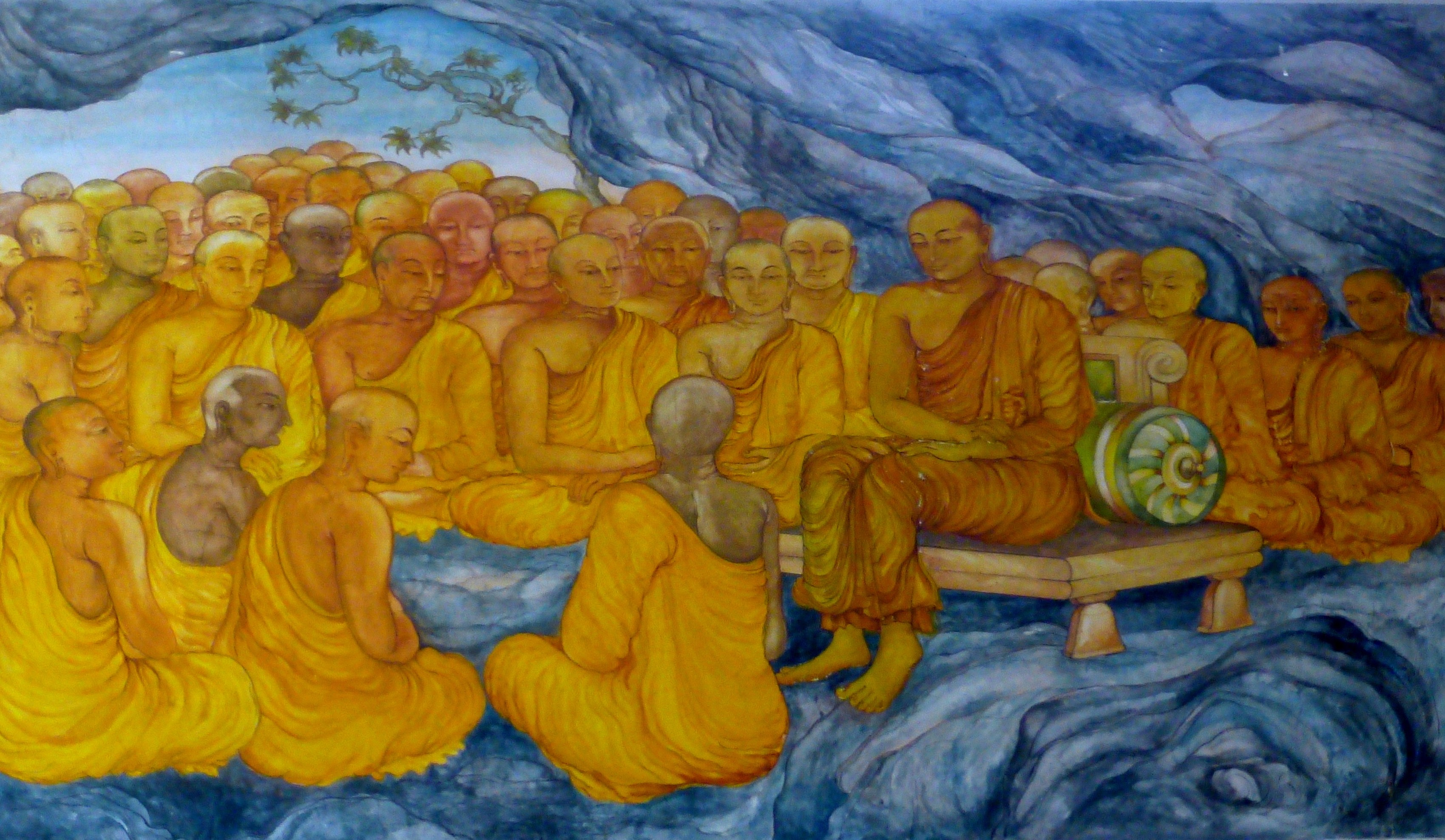
Jetavana temple in Rājagṛiha, India. Wall painting depicting the First Buddhist Council, during which Ānanda is said to have pronounced the formula:"evaṃ me sutaṃ" (Thus have I heard.) as an introduction to each of the Buddha's discourses that he recited from memory.

==== Recitations ====
The First Council began when Ānanda was consulted to recite the discourses and to determine which were authentic and which were not. Mahākassapa asked of each discourse that Ānanda listed where, when, and to whom it was given, and at the end of this, the assembly agreed that Ānanda's memories and recitations were correct, after which the discourse collection (Pali: Sutta Piṭaka, Sanskrit: Sūtra Piṭaka) was considered finalized and closed. Ānanda therefore played a crucial role in this council, and texts claim he remembered 84,000 teaching topics, among which 82,000 taught by the Buddha and another 2,000 taught by disciples. (Note: Other sources say he remembered 60,000 words and 15,000 stanzas, or 10,000 words.) Many early Buddhist discourses started with the words "Thus have I heard" (Pali: Evaṃ me sutaṃ, Sanskrit: Evaṃ mayā śrutam), which according to most Buddhist traditions, were Ānanda's words, (Note: Some Mahāyāna commentators held that in some cases these were the words of a bodhisattva (someone striving to become a Buddha) like Mañjuśrī.) indicating that he, as the person reporting the text (Sanskrit: saṃgītikāra), had first-hand experience and did not add anything to it. Thus, the discourses Ānanda remembered later became the collection of discourses of the Canon, and according to the Haimavāta, Dharmaguptaka and Sarvāstivāda textual traditions (and implicitly, post-canonical Pāli chronicles), the collection of Abhidhamma (Abhidhamma Piṭaka) as well. Scholar of religion Ronald Davidson notes, however, that this is not preceded by any account of Ānanda learning Abhidhamma. According to some later Mahāyāna accounts, Ānanda also assisted in reciting Mahāyāna texts, held in a different place in Rājagaha, but in the same time period. The Pāli commentaries state that after the council, when the tasks for recitation and memorizing the texts were divided, Ānanda and his pupils were given the task to remember the Dīgha Nikāya.

Two companion statues, 8th century, China

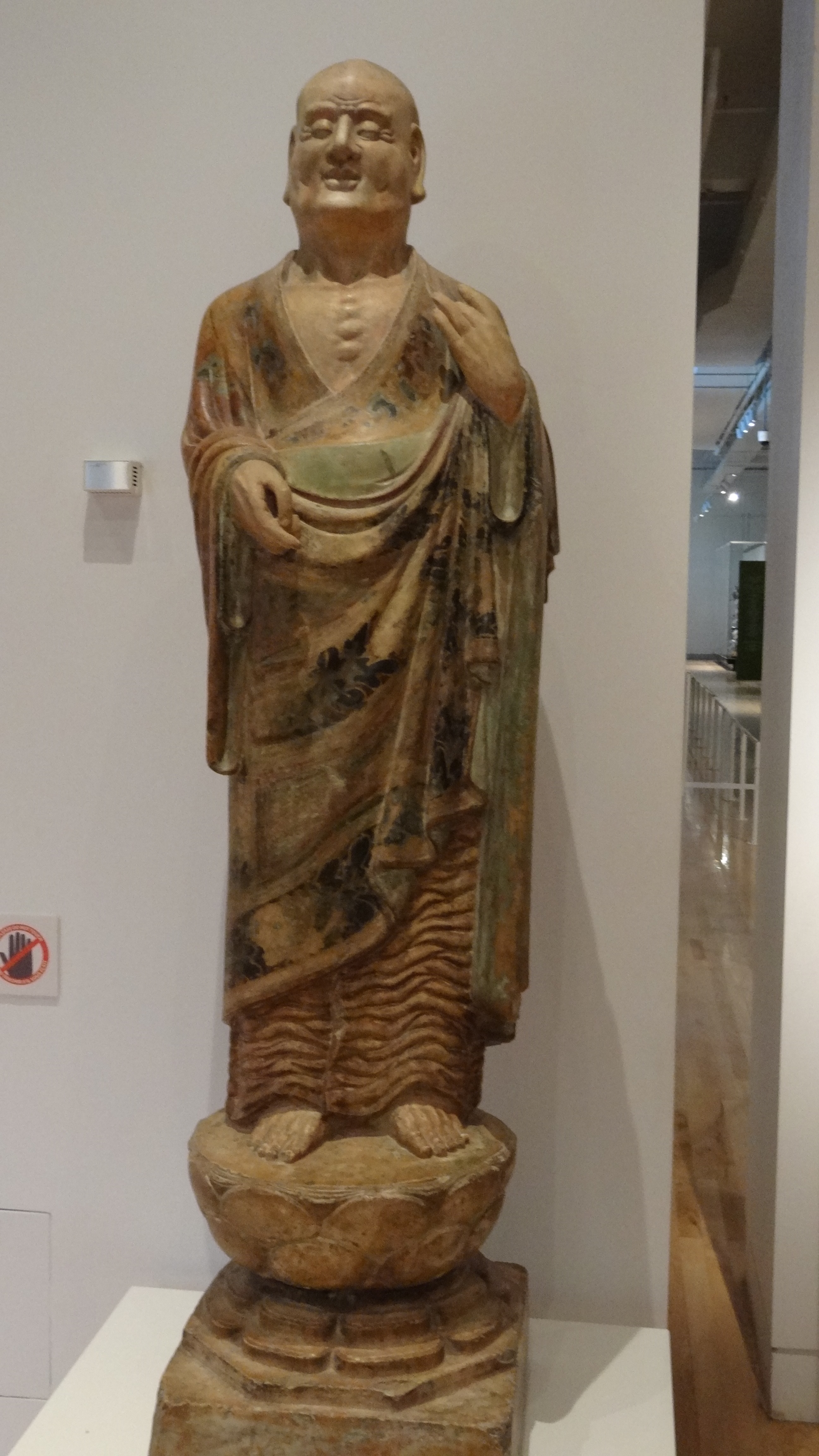
Mahākassapa

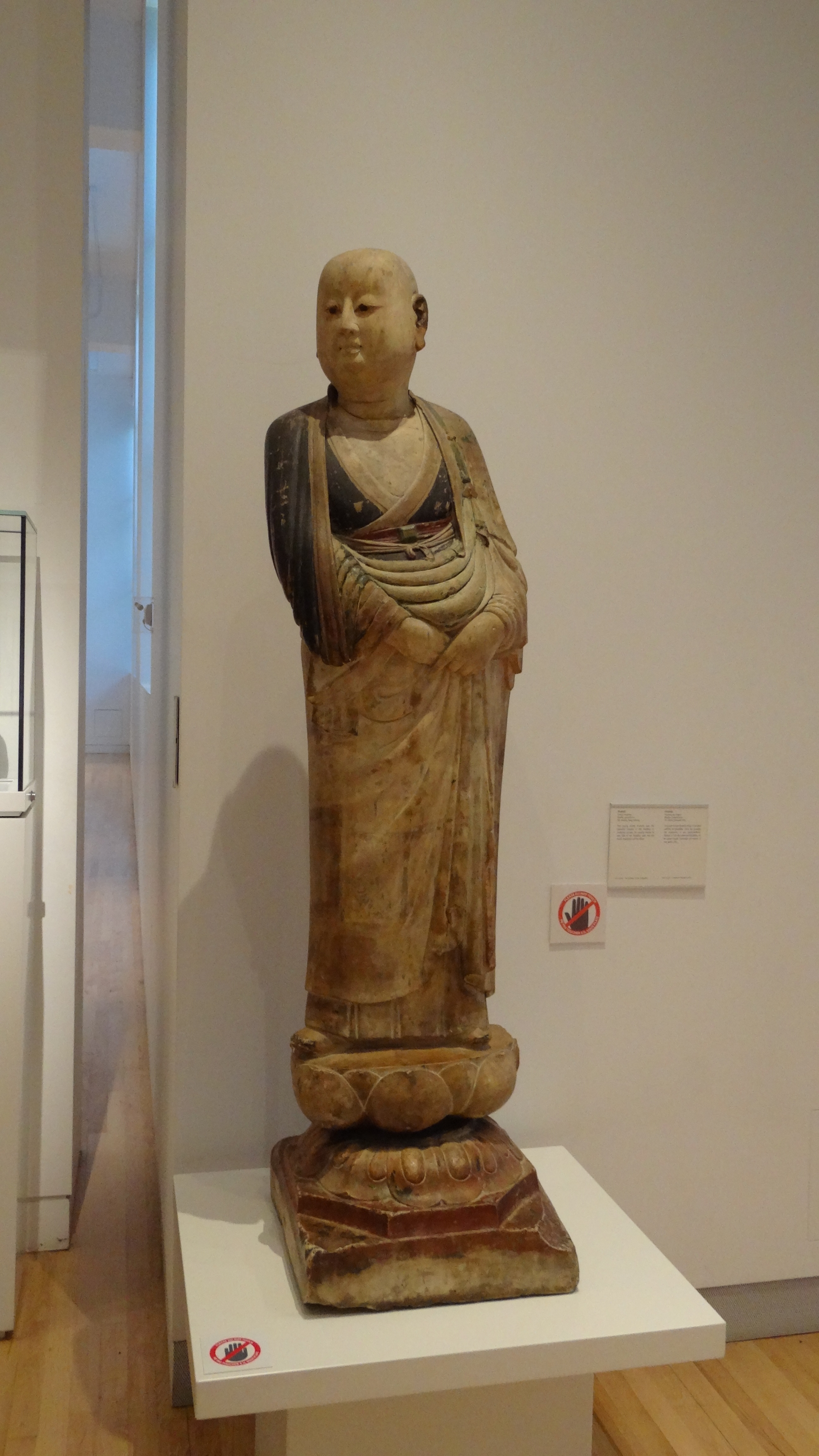
Ānanda

The First Buddhist Council began when Mahākassapa asked Ānanda to recite the discourses.

==== Charges ====
During the same council, Ānanda was charged for an offense by members of the saṅgha for having enabled women to join the monastic order. Besides this, he was charged for having forgotten to request the Buddha to specify which offenses of monastic discipline could be disregarded; (Note: The Buddha mentioned to Ānanda that "minor rules" could be abolished.) for having stepped on the Buddha's robe; for having allowed women to honor the Buddha's body after his death, which was not properly dressed, and during which his body was sullied by their tears; and for having failed to ask the Buddha to continue to live on. Ānanda did not acknowledge these as offenses, but he conceded to do a formal confession anyway, "... in faith of the opinion of the venerable elder monks"—Ānanda wanted to prevent disruption in the saṅgha. With regard to having women ordained, Ānanda answered that he had done this with great effort, because Mahāpajāpati was the Buddha's foster-mother who had long provided for him. With regard to not requesting the Buddha to continue to live, many textual traditions have Ānanda respond by saying he was distracted by Māra, though one early Chinese text has Ānanda reply he did not request the Buddha to prolong his life, for fear that this would interfere with the next Buddha Maitreya's ministry.

According to the Pāli tradition, the charges were laid after Ānanda had become enlightened and done all the recitations; but the Mūlasarvāstivāda tradition has it that the charges were laid before Ānanda became enlightened and started the recitations. In this version, when Ānanda heard that he was banned from the council, he objected that he had not done anything that went against the teaching and discipline of the Buddha. Mahākassapa then listed seven charges to counter Ānanda's objection. The charges were similar to the five given in Pāli. Other textual traditions list slightly different charges, amounting to a combined total of eleven charges, some of which are only mentioned in one or two textual traditions. Considering that an enlightened disciple was seen to have overcome all faults, it seems more likely that the charges were laid before Ānanda's attainment than after.

Indologists von Hinüber and Jean Przyluski argue that the account of Ānanda being charged with offenses during the council indicate tensions between competing early Buddhist schools, i.e. schools that emphasized the discourses (Pali: sutta, Sanskrit: sūtra) and schools that emphasized monastic discipline. These differences have affected the scriptures of each tradition: e.g. the Pāli and Mahīśāsaka textual traditions portray a Mahākassapa that is more critical of Ānanda than that the Sarvāstivāda tradition depicts him, reflecting a preference for discipline above discourse on the part of the former traditions, and a preference for discourse for the latter. Another example is the recitations during the First Council. The Pāli texts state that Upāli, the person who was responsible for the recitation of the monastic discipline, recited before Ānanda does: again, monastic discipline above discourse. Analyzing six recensions of different textual traditions of the Mahāparinibbāna Sutta extensively, Bareau distinguished two layers in the text, an older and a newer one, the former belonging to the compilers that emphasized discourse, the latter to the ones that emphasized discipline; the former emphasizing the figure of Ānanda, the latter Mahākassapa. He further argued that the passage on Māra obstructing the Buddha was inserted in the fourth century BCE, and that Ānanda was blamed for Māra's doing by inserting the passage of Ānanda's forgetfulness in the third century BCE. The passage in which the Buddha was ill and reminded Ānanda to be his own refuge, on the other hand, Bareau regarded as very ancient, pre-dating the passages blaming Māra and Ānanda. In conclusion, Bareau, Przyluski and Horner argued that the offenses Ānanda were charged with were a later interpolation. Findly disagrees, however, because the account in the texts of monastic discipline fits in with the Mahāparinibbāna Sutta and with Ānanda's character as generally depicted in the texts.

==== Historicity ====
Tradition states that the First Council lasted for seven months. Scholars doubt, however, whether the entire canon was really recited during the First Council, because the early texts contain different accounts on important subjects such as meditation. It may be, though, that early versions were recited of what is now known as the Vinaya-piṭaka and Sutta-piṭaka. Nevertheless, many scholars, from the late 19th century onward, have considered the historicity of the First Council improbable. Some scholars, such as orientalists Louis de La Vallée-Poussin and D.P. Minayeff, thought there must have been assemblies after the Buddha's death, but considered only the main characters and some events before or after the First Council historical. Other scholars, such as Bareau and Indologist Hermann Oldenberg, considered it likely that the account of the First Council was written after the Second Council, and based on that of the Second, since there were not any major problems to solve after the Buddha's death, or any other need to organize the First Council. Much material in the accounts, and even more so in the more developed later accounts, deal with Ānanda as the unsullied intermediary who passes on the legitimate teaching of the Buddha. On the other hand, archaeologist Louis Finot, Indologist E. E. Obermiller and to some extent Indologist Nalinaksha Dutt thought the account of the First Council was authentic, because of the correspondences between the Pāli texts and the Sanskrit traditions. Indologist Richard Gombrich, following Bhikkhu Sujato and Bhikkhu Brahmali's arguments, states that "it makes good sense to believe ... that large parts of the Pali Canon do preserve for us the Buddha-vacana, 'the Buddha's words', transmitted to us via his disciple Ānanda and the First Council".

=== Role and character ===
The attendant

"He served the Buddha following him everywhere like a shadow, bringing him tooth wood and water, washing his feet, rubbing his body, cleaning his cell and fulfilling all his duties with the greatest care. By day he was at hand forestalling the slightest wish of the Buddha. At night, staff and torch in hand, he went nine times round the Buddha's cell and never put them down lest he would fall asleep and fail to answer a call to the Buddha."

— transl. by Ellison Banks Findly, Manorathapūranī

Ānanda was recognized as one of the most important disciples of the Buddha. In the lists of the disciples given in the Aṅguttara Nikāya (Note: Page i. xiv.) and Saṃyutta Nikāya, each of the disciples is declared to be foremost in some quality. Ānanda is mentioned more often than any other disciple: he is named foremost in conduct, in attention to others, in power of memory, in erudition and in resoluteness. Ānanda was the subject of a sermon of praise delivered by the Buddha just before the Buddha's death, as described in the Mahāparinibbāna Sutta: it is a sermon about a man who is kindly, unselfish, popular, and thoughtful toward others. In the texts he is depicted as compassionate in his relations with lay people, a compassion he learnt from the Buddha. The Buddha relays that both monastics and lay people were pleased to see Ānanda, and were pleased to hear him recite and teach the Buddha's teaching. Moreover, Ānanda was known for his organizational skills, assisting the Buddha with secretary-like duties. In many ways, Ānanda did not only serve the personal needs of the Buddha, but also the needs of the still young, growing institute of the saṅgha.

Moreover, because of his ability to remember the many teachings of the Buddha, he is described as foremost in "having heard much" (Pali: bahussuta, Sanskrit: bahuśruta, pinyin: Duowen Diyi). Ānanda was known for his exceptional memory, which is essential in helping him to remember the Buddha's teachings. He also taught other disciples to memorize Buddhist doctrine. For these reasons, Ānanda became known as the "Treasurer of the Dhamma" (Pali: Dhamma-bhaṇḍāgārika, Sanskrit: Dharma-bhaṇḍāgārika), Dhamma (Sanskrit: Dharma) referring to the doctrine of the Buddha. Being the person who had accompanied the Buddha throughout a great part of his life, Ānanda was in many ways the living memory of the Buddha, without which the saṅgha would be much worse off. Besides his memory skills, Ānanda also stood out in that, as the Buddha's cousin, he dared to ask the Buddha direct questions. For example, after the death of Mahāvira and the depicted subsequent conflicts among the Jain community, Ānanda asked the Buddha how such problems could be prevented after the Buddha's death. (Note: The Buddha responded with a discussion of the role of a teacher, a student and the teaching, and concluded that he himself had proclaimed his teaching well. He continued that disputes about monastic discipline were not so much a problem, but disputes about "the path and the way" were.) However, Findly argues that Ānanda's duty to memorize the Buddha's teachings accurately and without distortion, was "both a gift and a burden". Ānanda was able to remember many discourses verbatim, but this also went hand-in-hand with a habit of not reflecting on those teachings, being afraid that reflection might distort the teachings as he heard them. At multiple occasions, Ānanda was warned by other disciples that he should spend less time on conversing to lay people, and more time on his own practice. Even though Ānanda regularly practiced meditation for long hours, he was less experienced in meditative concentration than other leading disciples. Thus, judgment of Ānanda's character depends on whether one judges his accomplishments as a monk or his accomplishments as an attendant, and person memorizing the discourses.

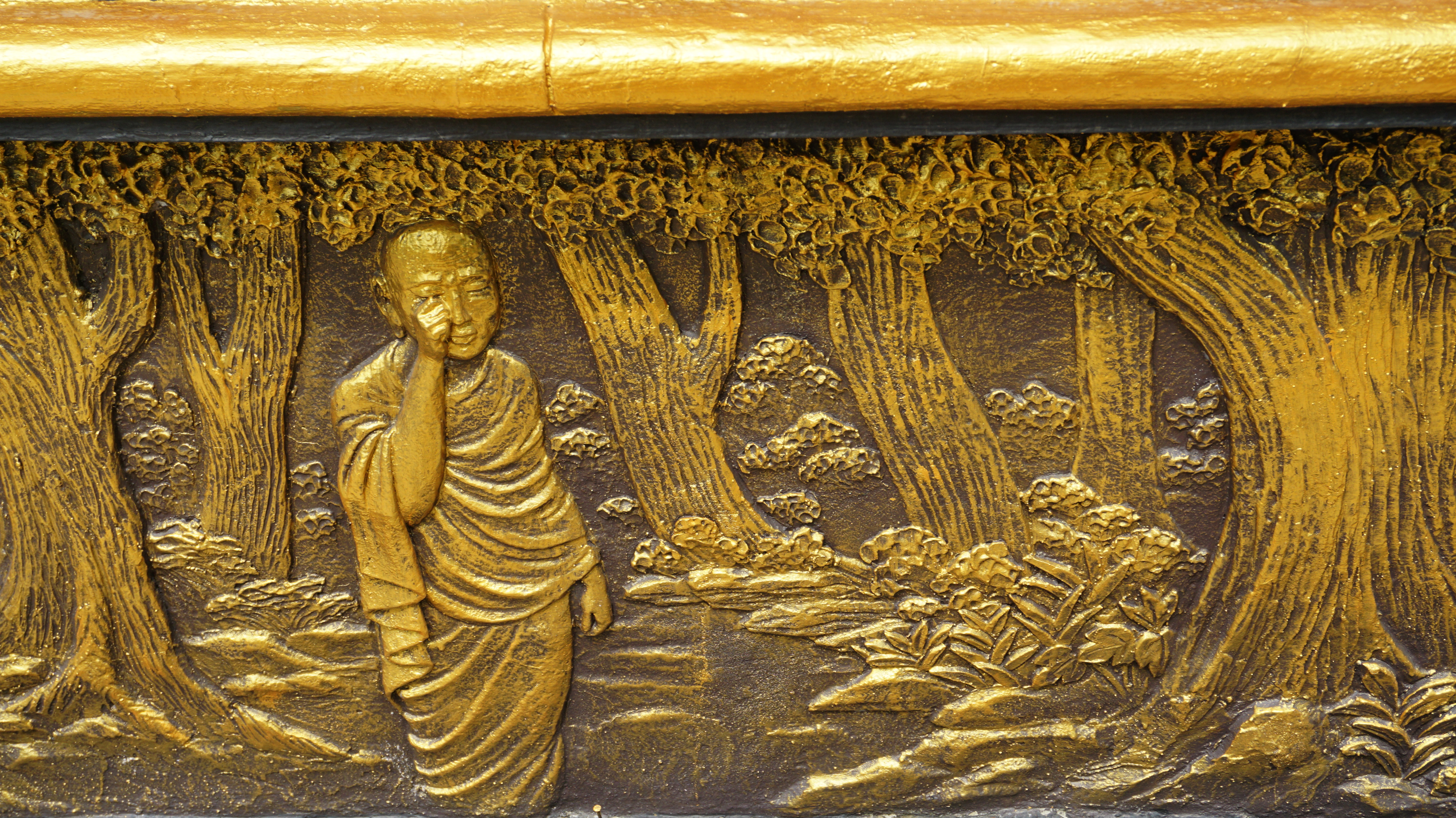
East Javanese relief of Ānanda, depicted weeping

From a literary and didactic point of view, Ānanda often functioned as a kind of foil in the texts, being an unenlightened disciple attending to an enlightened Buddha. Because the run-of the-mill person could identify with Ānanda, the Buddha could through Ānanda convey his teachings to the mass easily. Ānanda's character was in many ways a contradiction to that of the Buddha: being unenlightened and someone who made mistakes. At the same time, however, he was completely devoted to service to the Buddha. The Buddha is depicted in the early texts as both a father and a teacher to Ānanda, stern but compassionate. Ānanda was very fond of and attached to the Buddha, willing to give his life for him. He mourned the deaths of both the Buddha and Sāriputta, with whom he enjoyed a close friendship: in both cases Ānanda was very shocked. Ānanda's faith in the Buddha, however, constituted more of a faith in a person, especially the Buddha's person, as opposed to faith in the Buddha's teaching. This is a pattern which comes back in the accounts which lead to the offenses Ānanda was charged with during the First Council. Moreover, Ānanda's weaknesses described in the texts were that he was sometimes slow-witted and lacked mindfulness, which became noticeable because of his role as attendant to the Buddha: this involved minor matters like deportment, but also more important matters, such as ordaining a man with no future as a pupil, or disturbing the Buddha at the wrong time. For example, one time Mahākassapa chastised Ānanda in strong words, criticizing the fact that Ānanda was travelling with a large following of young monks who appeared untrained and who had built up a bad reputation. In another episode described in a Sarvāstivāda text, Ānanda is the only disciple who was willing to teach psychic powers to Devadatta, who later would use these in an attempt to destroy the Buddha. According to a Mahīśāsaka text, however, when Devadatta had turned against the Buddha, Ānanda was not persuaded by him, and voted against him in a formal meeting. Ānanda's late spiritual growth is much discussed in Buddhist texts, and the general conclusion is that Ānanda was slower than other disciples due to his worldly attachments and his attachment to the person of the Buddha, both of which were rooted in his mediating work between the Buddha and the lay communities.

=== Passing on the teaching ===
After the Buddha's death, some sources say Ānanda stayed mostly in the West of India, in the area of Kosambī (Sanskrit: Kausambī), where he taught most of his pupils. Other sources say he stayed in the monastery at Veḷuvana (Sanskrit: Veṇuvana). Several pupils of Ānanda became well-known in their own right. According to post-canonical Sanskrit sources such as the Divyavadāna and the Aśokavadāna, before the Buddha's death, the Buddha confided to Ānanda that the latter's student Majjhantika (Sanskrit: Madhyāntika) would travel to Udyāna, Kashmir, to bring the teaching of the Buddha there. Mahākassapa made a prediction that later would come true that another of Ānanda's future pupils, Sāṇavāsī (Sanskrit: Śāṇakavāsī, Śāṇakavāsin or Śāṇāvasika), would make many gifts to the saṅgha at Mathurā, during a feast held from profits of successful business. After this event, Ānanda would successfully persuade Sāṇavāsī to become ordained and be his pupil. Ānanda later persuaded Sāṇavāsī by pointing out that the latter had now made many material gifts, but had not given "the gift of the Dhamma". When asked for explanation, Ānanda replied that Sāṇavāsī would give the gift of Dhamma by becoming ordained as a monk, which was reason enough for Sāṇavāsī to make the decision to get ordained.

=== Death and relics ===
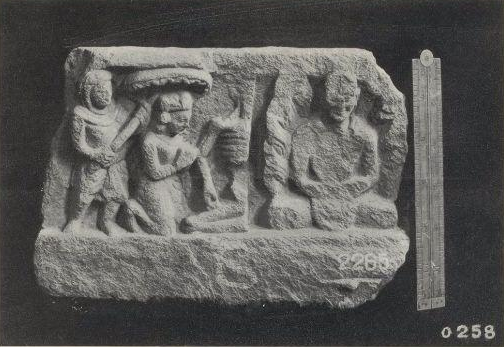
Partially recovered Indian bas-relief depicting the death of Ānanda. The traditional Buddhist accounts relate that he attained final Nirvana in mid-air above the river Rohīni, leaving relics for followers on both sides of the river.

Though no Early Buddhist Text provides a date for Ānanda's death, according to the Chinese pilgrim monk Faxian (337–422 CE), Ānanda went on to live 120 years. Following the later timeline, however, Ānanda may have lived to 75–85 years. Buddhist studies scholar L. S. Cousins dated Ānanda's death twenty years after the Buddha's.

Ānanda was teaching till the end of his life. According to Mūlasarvāstivāda sources, Ānanda heard a young monk recite a verse incorrectly, and advised him. When the monk reported this to his teacher, the latter objected that "Ānanda has grown old and his memory is impaired ..." This prompted Ānanda to attain final Nirvana. He passed on the "custody of the [Buddha's] doctrine" to his pupil Sāṇavāsī and left for the river Ganges. However, according to Pāli sources, when Ānanda was about to die, he decided to spend his final moments in Vesālī instead, and traveled to the river Rohīni. The Mūlasarvāstivāda version expands and says that before reaching the river, he met with a seer called Majjhantika (following the prediction earlier) and five hundred of his followers, who converted to Buddhism. Some sources add that Ānanda passed the Buddha's message on to him. When Ānanda was crossing the river, he was followed by King Ajātasattu (Sanskrit: Ajātaśatrū), who wanted to witness his death and was interested in his remains as relics. Ānanda had once promised Ajāsattu that he would let him know when he would die, and accordingly, Ānanda had informed him. On the other side of the river, however, a group of Licchavis from Vesālī awaited him for the same reason. In the Pāli, there were also two parties interested, but the two parties were the Sākiyan and the Koliyan clans instead. Ānanda realized that his death on either side of the river could anger one of the parties involved. Through a supernatural accomplishment, he therefore surged into the air to levitate and meditate in mid-air, making his body go up in fire, with his relics landing on both banks of the river, or in some versions of the account, splitting in four parts. In this way, Ānanda had pleased all the parties involved. In some other versions of the account, including the Mūlasarvāstivāda version, his death took place on a barge in the middle of the river, however, instead of in mid-air. The remains were divided in two, following the wishes of Ānanda.

Majjhantika later successfully carried out the mission following the Buddha's prediction. The latter's pupil Upagupta was described to be the teacher of King Aśoka (3rd century BCE). Together with four or five other pupils of Ānanda, Sāṇavāsī and Majjhantika formed the majority of the Second Council, with Majjhantika being Ānanda's last pupil. Post-canonical Pāli sources add that Sāṇavāsī had a leading role in the Third Buddhist Council as well. Although little is historically certain, Cousins thought it likely at least one of the leading figures on the Second Council was a pupil of Ānanda, as nearly all the textual traditions mention a connection with Ānanda.

Ajāsattu is said to have built a stūpa on top of the Ānanda's relics, at the river Rohīni, or according to some sources, the Ganges; the Licchavis had also built a stūpa at their side of the river. The Chinese pilgrim Xuan Zang (602–64 CE) later visited stūpas on both sides of the river Rohīni. Faxian also reported having visited stūpas dedicated to Ānanda at the river Rohīni, but also in Mathurā. Moreover, according to a text from the Aśokāvadāna that has been accidentally interpolated into the Mūlasarvāstivāda version of the Saṃyukta Āgama, King Aśoka visited and made the most lavish offerings he ever made to a stūpa:

"Who in the Norm is widely versed,

And bears its doctrines in his heart—
Of the great Master's treasure Ward—
An eye was he for all the world,
Ānanda, who is passed away."

— transl. by C. A. F. Rhys Davids, Theragāthā

He explained to his ministers that he did this because "[t]he body of the Tathāgata is the body of dharma(s), pure in nature. He [Ānanda] was able to retain it/them all; for this reason the offerings [to him] surpass [all others]"—body of dharma here referred to the Buddha's teachings as a whole.

In early Buddhist texts, Ānanda had reached final nirvana and would no longer be reborn. But, in contrast with the early texts, according to the Mahāyāna Lotus Sūtra, Ānanda would be born as a Buddha in the future. He would accomplish this slower than the present Buddha, Gotama Buddha, had accomplished this, because Ānanda aspired to becoming a Buddha by applying "great learning". Because of this long trajectory and great efforts, however, his enlightenment would be extraordinary and with great splendor.

== Legacy ==
In Mahāyāna iconography, Ānanda is often depicted flanking the Buddha at the right side, together with Mahākassapa at the left.

Ānanda is depicted as an eloquent speaker, who often taught about the self and about meditation. There are numerous Buddhist texts attributed to Ānanda, including the Atthakanāgara Sutta, about meditation methods to attain Nirvana; a version of the Bhaddekaratta Sutta (Sanskrit: Bhadrakārātrī, pinyin: shanye), about living in the present moment; the Sekha Sutta, about the higher training of a disciple of the Buddha; the Subha Suttanta, about the practices the Buddha inspired others to follow. In the Gopaka-Mogallānasutta, a conversation took place between Ānanda, the brahmin Gopaka-Mogallāna and the minister Vassakara, the latter being the highest official of the Magadha region. During this conversation, which occurred shortly after the Buddha's death, Vassakara asked whether it was decided yet who would succeed the Buddha. Ānanda replied that no such successor had been appointed, but that the Buddhist community took the Buddha's teaching and discipline as a refuge instead. Furthermore, the saṅgha did not have the Buddha as a master anymore, but they would honor those monks who were virtuous and trustworthy. Besides these suttas, a section of the Theragāthā is attributed to Ānanda. Even in the texts attributed to the Buddha himself, Ānanda is sometimes depicted giving a name to a particular text, or suggesting a simile to the Buddha to use in his teachings.

In East Asian Buddhism, Ānanda is considered one of the ten principal disciples. In many Indian Sanskrit and East Asian texts, Ānanda is considered the second patriarch of the lineage which transmitted the teaching of the Buddha, with Mahākassapa being the first and Majjhantika or Saṇavāsī being the third. There is an account dating back from the Sarvāstivāda and Mūlasarvāstivāda textual traditions which states that before Mahākassapa died, he bestowed the Buddha's teaching on Ānanda as a formal passing on of authority, telling Ānanda to pass the teaching on to Ānanda's pupil Saṇavāsī. Later, just before Ānanda died, he did as Mahākassapa had told him to. Buddhist studies scholars Akira Hirakawa and Bibhuti Baruah have expressed skepticism about the teacher–student relationship between Mahākassapa and Ānanda, arguing that there was discord between the two, as indicated in the early texts. Regardless, it is clear from the texts that a relationship of transmission of teachings is meant, as opposed to an upajjhāya–student relationship in a lineage of ordination: no source indicates Mahākassapa was Ānanda's upajjhāya. In Mahāyāna iconography, Ānanda is often depicted flanking the Buddha at the right side, together with Mahākassapa at the left. In Theravāda iconography, however, Ānanda is usually not depicted in this manner, and the motif of transmission of the Dhamma through a list of patriarchs is not found in Pāli sources.

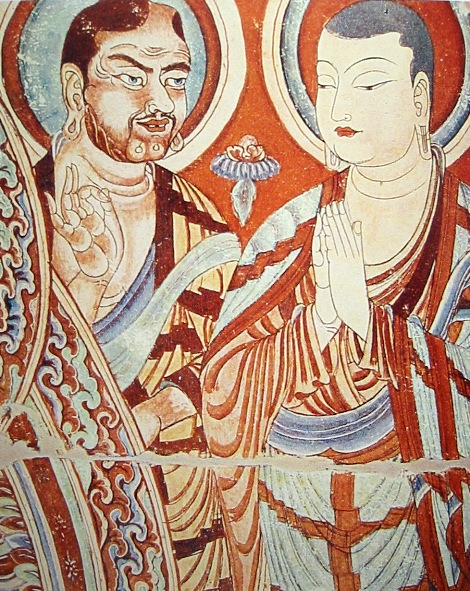
8th–9th century Chinese painting, depicting two monks dressed in robes made of pieces. Pāli tradition has it that Ānanda designed the Buddhist monk's robe, based on the structure of rice fields.

Because Ānanda was instrumental in founding the bhikkhunī community, he has been honored by bhikkhunīs for this throughout Buddhist history. The earliest traces of this can be found in the writings of Faxian and Xuan Zang, who reported that bhikkhunīs made offerings to a stūpa in Ānanda's honor during celebrations and observance days. On a similar note, in 5th–6th-century China and 10th-century Japan, Buddhist texts were composed recommending women to uphold the semi-monastic eight precepts in honor and gratitude of Ānanda. In Japan, this was done through the format of a penance ritual called keka (Chinese: 悔過). By the 13th century, in Japan a cult-like interest for Ānanda had developed in a number of convents, in which images and stūpas were used and ceremonies were held in his honor. Presently, opinion among scholars is divided as to whether Ānanda's cult among bhikkhunīs was an expression of their dependence on male monastic tradition, or the opposite, an expression of their legitimacy and independence.

Pāli Vinaya texts attribute the design of the Buddhist monk's robe to Ānanda. As Buddhism prospered, more laypeople started to donate expensive cloth for robes, which put the monks at risk for theft. To decrease its commercial value, monks therefore cut up the cloth offered, before they sew a robe from it. The Buddha asked Ānanda to think of a model for a Buddhist robe, made from small pieces of cloth. Ānanda designed a standard robe model, based on the rice fields of Magadha, which were divided in sections by banks of earth. Another tradition that is connected to Ānanda is paritta recitation. Theravāda Buddhists explain that the custom of sprinkling water during paritta chanting originates in Ānanda's visit to Vesālī, when he recited the Ratana Sutta and sprinkled water from his alms bowl. A third tradition sometimes attributed to Ānanda is the use of Bodhi trees in Buddhism. It is described in the text Kāliṅgabodhi Jātaka that Ānanda planted a Bodhi tree as a symbol of the Buddha's enlightenment, to give people the chance to pay their respects to the Buddha. This tree and shrine came to be known as the Ānanda Bodhi Tree, said to have grown from a seed from the original Bodhi Tree under which the Buddha is depicted to have attained enlightenment. Many of this type of Bodhi Tree shrines in Southeast Asia were erected following this example. Presently, the Ānanda Bodhi Tree is sometimes identified with a tree at the ruins of Jetavana, Sāvatthi, based on the records of Faxian.

== In art ==
Between 1856 and 1858 Richard Wagner wrote a draft for an opera libretto based on the legend about Ānanda and the low-caste girl Prakṛti. He left only a fragmentary prose sketch of a work to be called Die Sieger, but the topic inspired his later opera Parsifal. Furthermore, the draft was used by composer Jonathan Harvey in his 2007 opera Wagner Dream. In Wagner's version of the legend, which he based on orientalist Eugène Burnouf's translations, the magical spell of Prakṛti's mother does not work on Ānanda, and Prakṛti turns to the Buddha to explain her desires for Ānanda. The Buddha replies that a union between Prakṛti and Ānanda is possible, but Prakṛti must agree to the Buddha's conditions. Prakṛti agrees, and it is revealed that the Buddha means something else than she does: he asks Prakṛti to ordain as a bhikkhunī, and live the celibate life as a kind of sister to Ānanda. At first, Prakṛti weeps in dismay, but after the Buddha explains that her current situation is a result of karma from her previous life, she understands and rejoices in the life of a bhikkhunī. Apart from the spiritual themes, Wagner also addresses the faults of the caste system by having the Buddha criticize it.

Drawing from Schopenhauer's philosophy, Wagner contrasts desire-driven salvation and true spiritual salvation: by seeking deliverance through the person she loves, Prakṛti only affirms her will to live (German: Wille zum Leben), which is blocking her from attaining deliverance. By being ordained as a bhikkhunī she strives for her spiritual salvation instead. Thus, the early Buddhist account of Mahāpajāpati's ordination is replaced by that of Prakṛti. According to Wagner, by allowing Prakṛti to become ordained, the Buddha also completes his own aim in life: "[H]e regards his existence in the world, whose aim was to benefit all beings, as completed, since he had become able to offer deliverance—without mediation—also to woman."

The same legend of Ānanda and Prakṛti was made into a short prose play by the Indian poet Rabindranath Tagore, called Chandalika. Chandalika deals with the themes of spiritual conflict, caste and social equality, and contains a strong critique of Indian society. Just like in the traditional account, Prakṛti falls in love with Ānanda, after he gives her self-esteem by accepting a gift of water from her. Prakṛti's mother casts a spell to enchant Ānanda. In Tagore's play, however, Prakṛti later regrets what she has done and has the spell revoked.

Buddhist titles
Preceded by Mahākāśyapa	Chan and Zen lineages (According to the Zen schools of China and Japan)	Succeeded by Shanavasa
