= Thus have I heard =

Standard formula to introduce Buddhist discourses

Translations of Thus have I heard
- Sanskrit: Evaṃ mayā śrutam
- Pali: Evaṃ me sutaṃ
- Chinese: 如是我聞 (Pinyin: rúshìwǒwén)
- Japanese: 如是我聞 (Rōmaji: nyozegamon)
- Korean: 여시아문 (RR: yeosiamun)
- Tagalog: Ganito ang narinig ko
- Tibetan: འདི་སྐད་བདག་གིས་ཐོས་པ་དུས་གཅིག་ན ('di skad bdag gis thos pa dus gcig na)
- Vietnamese: như thị ngã văn / ta nghe như vầy
- Taiwanese: lemangeda aken a maitucu

Thus have I heard (Pali: Evaṃ me sutaṃ; Sanskrit: Evaṃ mayā śrutam) is the common translation of the first line of the standard introduction (Pāli and Sanskrit: nidāna) of Buddhist discourses. This phrase serves to confirm that the discourse is coming from the Buddha himself, as a "seal of authenticity". Buddhist tradition maintains that the disciple Ānanda used the formula for the first time, as a form of personal testimony, but this is disputed by some scholars. It is also disputed how the phrase relates to the words that follow, and several theories have been developed with regard to how the text was originally intended to be read. The formula has also been used in later Mahāyāna and Vajrayāna discourses.

== History and function ==
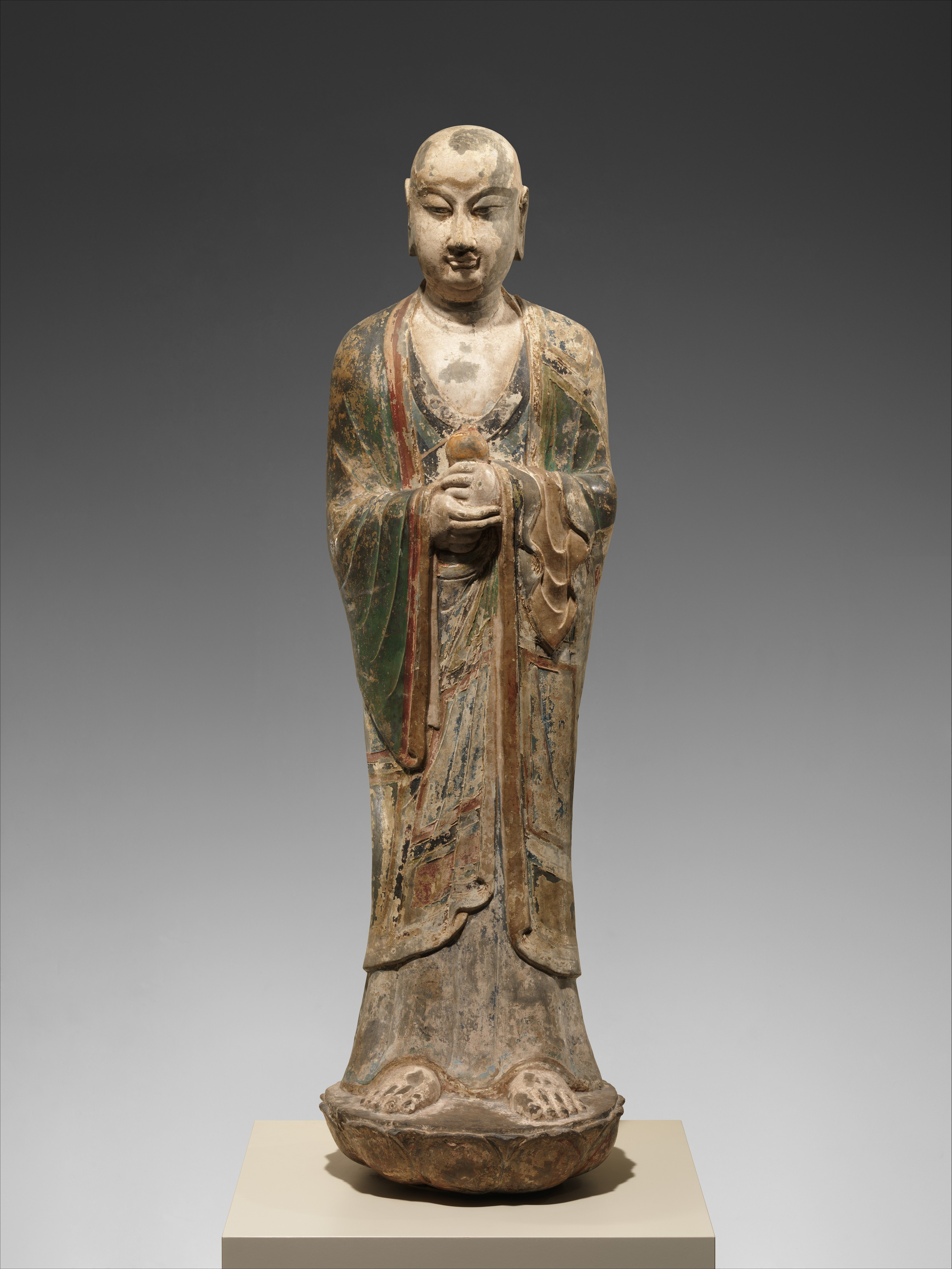
8th-century Chinese limestone sculpture of Ānanda

According to Buddhist tradition—based on the commentary to the Dīgha Nikāya—the formula was first used by the disciple Ānanda during the First Buddhist Council held at Rājagṛha (present-day Rajgir). At this gathering, the Buddhist Canon was established, and Ānanda was given the role of rapporteur (Sanskrit: saṃgītakāra) of the Buddha's teachings, being the personal attendant of the Buddha.

The formula is usually followed by the place where the discourse is given, as well as the names and numbers of those it is given to. In the Chinese exegetical tradition, the formula is known as the generic preface (Chinese: 通序; pinyin: tōngxù), as opposed to the subsequent part that differs between discourses, introducing the specifics, known as the specific preface (Chinese: 別序; pinyin: biéxù). In some Early Buddhist Texts, other similar constructions are used, such as 'This was said by the Blessed One' (Pali: Vutaṃ hetaṃ bhagavatā) in the Itivuttaka.

== Interpretation and translation ==
The formula is glossed by the 5th-century Indian commentator Buddhaghosa as "received in the Buddha's presence". Indologist Jean Filliozat (1906–82) disagreed with the traditional explanation that Ānanda was the one who invented the formula, arguing that the formula is an odd way to describe a first-hand witness account, as it sounds as though what follows is hearsay. He argued instead that it was a later compiler who added it. However, comparing Buddhist with Jain texts, Sanskrit scholar John Brough (1917–84) concluded the formula indicates personal testimony as opposed to hearsay.

Indologist Jean Przyluski (1885–1944) argued that the formula originally may also have meant that the Buddhist discourses were presented as part of sacred revelation (śruti). This was intended to prove that the Buddhist texts were on the same level with, or superior than, the Vedas in the Brahmanical tradition. Brough concurred with Przyluski that this may have played some role in the development of the phrase, but concluded that the motivation of declaring oneself a witness of the Buddha's teaching "could by itself quite adequately explain it". Brough relates a traditional account in which the Buddha's disciples weep when they hear Ānanda say the words Thus have I heard for the first time, "marvelling that they should hear again the very words of their dead master". Indologist Konrad Klaus disagrees with Brough, however, citing two discourses from the Dīgha Nikāya and Majjhima Nikāya in which the formula refers to what "... was acquired through communication by others", as opposed to personal experience. Klaus also points at another expression which does mean that a discourse has been directly received from someone, that is samukkhā me taṃ ... samukkhā paṭiggahitaṃ, meaning 'I heard and learned this from ...'s own lips': an expression often used with regard to the Buddha. He proposes that the formula Thus have I heard does mark a discourse as the Buddha's word, but not because the discourse has been heard from the Buddha's own lips by the speaker. He does admit that the early Sanskrit texts contain a later interpretation of the formula, which does refer to personal experience.

Indologist Étienne Lamotte (1903–83) argued it was the Buddha who had the formula placed at the beginning of the Buddhist discourses, conveying this through Ānanda.

In addition, the formula may have been used by editors to standardize the discourses, as it is even used in discourses given by Ānanda himself.

== Punctuation ==
There has been considerable debate as to how the first sentences of the preface of Buddhist discourses should be translated, especially with regard to punctuation. There are three main opinions. The first possible and most common translation is Thus have I heard. At one time the Blessed One was at ... in ... Buddhist studies scholar Mark Allon has defended this translation based on metrical and rhyme patterns. The words of the Pāli formula indicate the oral tradition through which the discourses were passed down. As with many parts of the discourses, the preface consist of rhymes to help memorization of the text, such as repetition of initial consonant sounds (alliteration; evaṃ, ekaṃ) and final sounds (homoioteleuton; evaṃ, suttaṃ, ekaṃ and samayaṃ). These rhyme patterns show that the two phrases, the first phrase starting with 'thus' (evaṃ me suttaṃ) and the second phrase, ekaṃ samayaṃ (Pāli; Sanskrit: ekasmin samaye), 'at one time', were seen as two separate units. On a similar note, the first phrase has a vedha type metrical pattern, which is repeated by the second phrase, ekaṃ samayaṃ, 'at one time'. Buddhist studies scholars Fernando Tola and Carmen Dragonetti have also argued for this translation with a three-word pre-amble (the three words being evaṃ me suttaṃ), on the grounds that it gives the best meaning to the context.

However, numerous scholars read the words 'at one time' (Pali: ekaṃ samayaṃ; Sanskrit: ekasmin samaye) as combined with the first phrase, making for a five-word preamble. In their opinion, the first lines should be translated to Thus have I heard at one time. The Blessed One was staying at ... in ... This translation is often attributed to Brough, but was first proposed by Orientalist Alexander von Staël-Holstein (1877–1937). Von Staël-Holstein preferred this translation, basing himself on Indian commentaries, and Brough based himself on Tibetan translations, common usage in Avadānas and Early Buddhist Texts, as well as Pāli and Sanskrit commentators. Indologist Oskar von Hinüber rejects Von Staël-Holstein's and Brough's interpretation, however. He argues that although in Sanskrit it may be possible to connect the two phrases in one sentence, in Pāli this is highly unusual. Von Hinüber further states that in the early Pāli texts, as well as the Pāli commentaries, separating the two phrases is actually quite common. Konrad Klaus agrees with von Hinüber's arguments. Buddhist studies scholar Brian Galloway further states that many Tibetan and Indian commentators such as Vimalamitra (8th century) did not support a five-word but rather a three-word pre-amble, reading at one time with the text following it. Religious Studies scholar Mark Tatz disagrees with Galloway's interpretation, however, providing several reasons. In response, Galloway rejects most of Tatz' arguments.

A third group of scholars believe that the details of the place should also be mentioned within the same sentence, with no punctuation: Thus have I heard at the one time when the Blessed one was staying at ... in ... This type of translation, called the "double-jointed construction", has been proposed by Religious Studies scholar Paul Harrison and Buddhologist Tilmann Vetter. Harrison bases himself on Tibetan translations and discussion in Sanskrit commentaries.

== Usage in Buddhist history ==
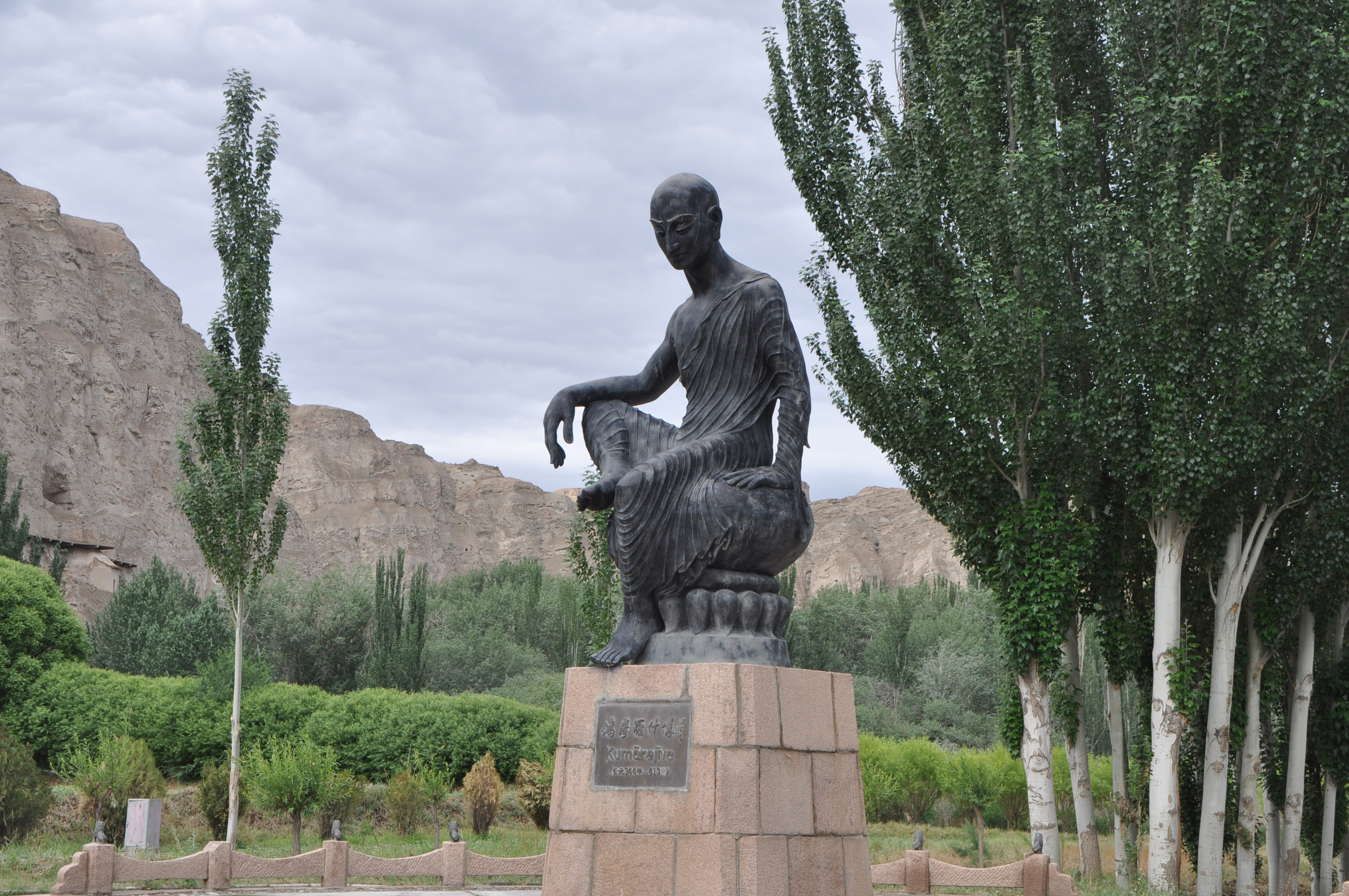
Statue of Kumārajīva in front of the Kizil Caves, Xinjiang, China

Prior to the 5th century, Chinese translations of Buddhist texts would often translate the standard formula as Heard like this (Chinese: 聞如是), leaving out the I for stylistic reasons. During the 5th century, translator Kumārajīva (344–413 CE) started rendering the formula as Rushi wowen (Chinese: 如是我聞; lit. 'Like this I hear'), which became the standard Chinese translation, despite its unnatural construction. (Note: The word order does not follow Chinese, but rather Indian syntax.)

Mahāyāna and Vajrayāna traditions considered many later discourses the Buddha's word, and also included the formula at the beginning of those. Indeed, the 5th-century Chinese commentary Dazhidulun recommends editors to do so. Often, Mahāyāna commentaries state that the formula can not only refer to Ānanda, but also to certain bodhisattvas, such as Mañjuśrī. Modern scholarship has drawn into question the historical value of most of these introductions of Mahāyāna discourses, though some scholars do not exclude the possibility that some of the content of the discourses themselves goes back to the Buddha.
