= Puṇṇa Mantānīputta =

Enlightened monastic disciple of the Buddha

Venerable Puṇṇa
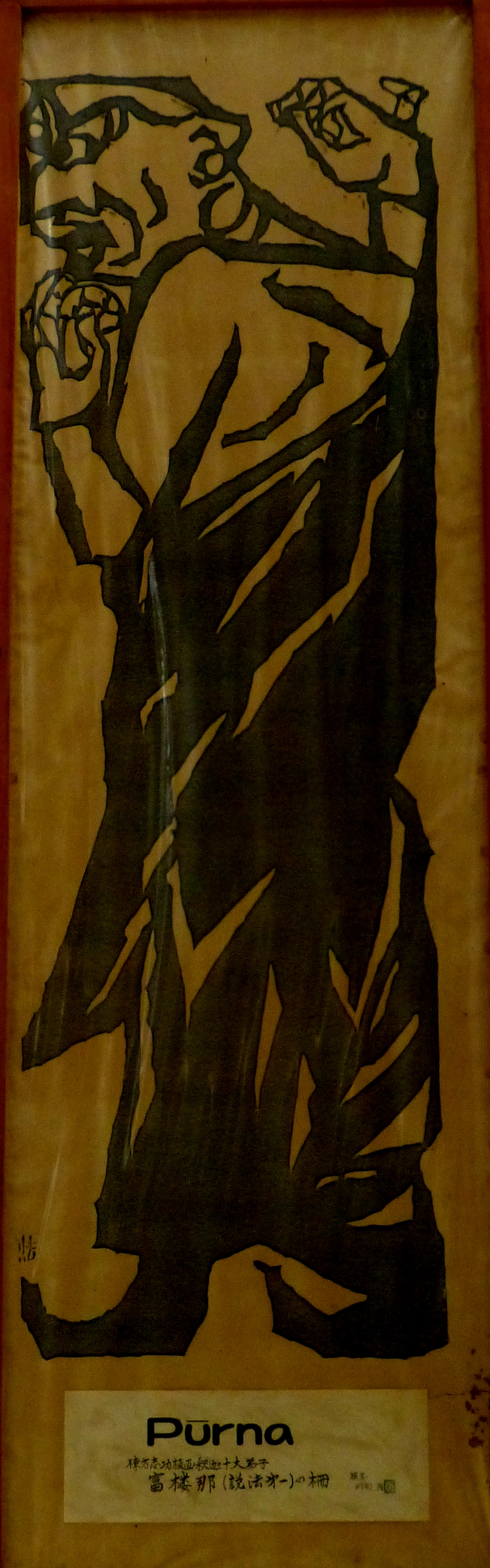

Personal life
- Born: Mantaniputta
- Occupation: Bhikkhu

Religious life
- Religion: Buddhism
- Lineage: nobel

Senior posting
- Teacher: Buddha

Pūrṇa Maitrāyanīputra (Sanskrit; Pali: Puṇṇa Mantānīputta, Chinese: 富楼那弥多罗尼子; pinyin: fùlóunàmíduōluónízǐ), also simply known as Pūrṇa (Sanskrit; Pali: Puṇṇa), was an arhat and one of the ten principal disciples of Gautama Buddha, foremost in preaching the dharma.

== Life ==
Puṇṇa Mantānīputta was born in Donavatthu, near Kapilavatthu, in a noble family. His mother was Mantānī (or Maitrāyanī), sister of Ven. Añña Koṇḍañña, who became Ven. Puṇṇa's teacher. Ven. Ānanda, after his first rain retreat, mentions him as a great influence in the Ānandasuttaṃ. He says that thanks to him, he was able to become a sotāpanna.

Ven. Sāriputta hears about Ven. Puṇṇa for the first time through a conversation between the Tathāgata and a group of shakyans who praised him. Then Ven. Sāriputta has the chance to meet Ven. Puṇṇa at Sāvatthī, where he asks Ven. Puṇṇa about the dharma without revealing his identity. As part of his answer, Ven. Puṇṇa uses the analogy of the relay chariots in the Rathavīnitasuttaṃ. Then both reveal their names. Ven. Puṇṇa says he is called Puṇṇa, but is known as Mantāniputta by his companions in the holy life, and Ven. Sāriputta says his name is Upatissa, but that he's known by his companions in the holy life as Sāriputta. They both praise one another.

== Bibliography ==
- Bhikkhu Bodhi (2000). The Connected Discourses of the Buddha: A Translation of the Samyutta Nikaya. Boston: Wisdom Publications. ISBN 0-86171-331-1.
