= Companion statues: Kashyapa and Ananda =

Pair of Tang dynasty sculptures, depicting Buddhist figures

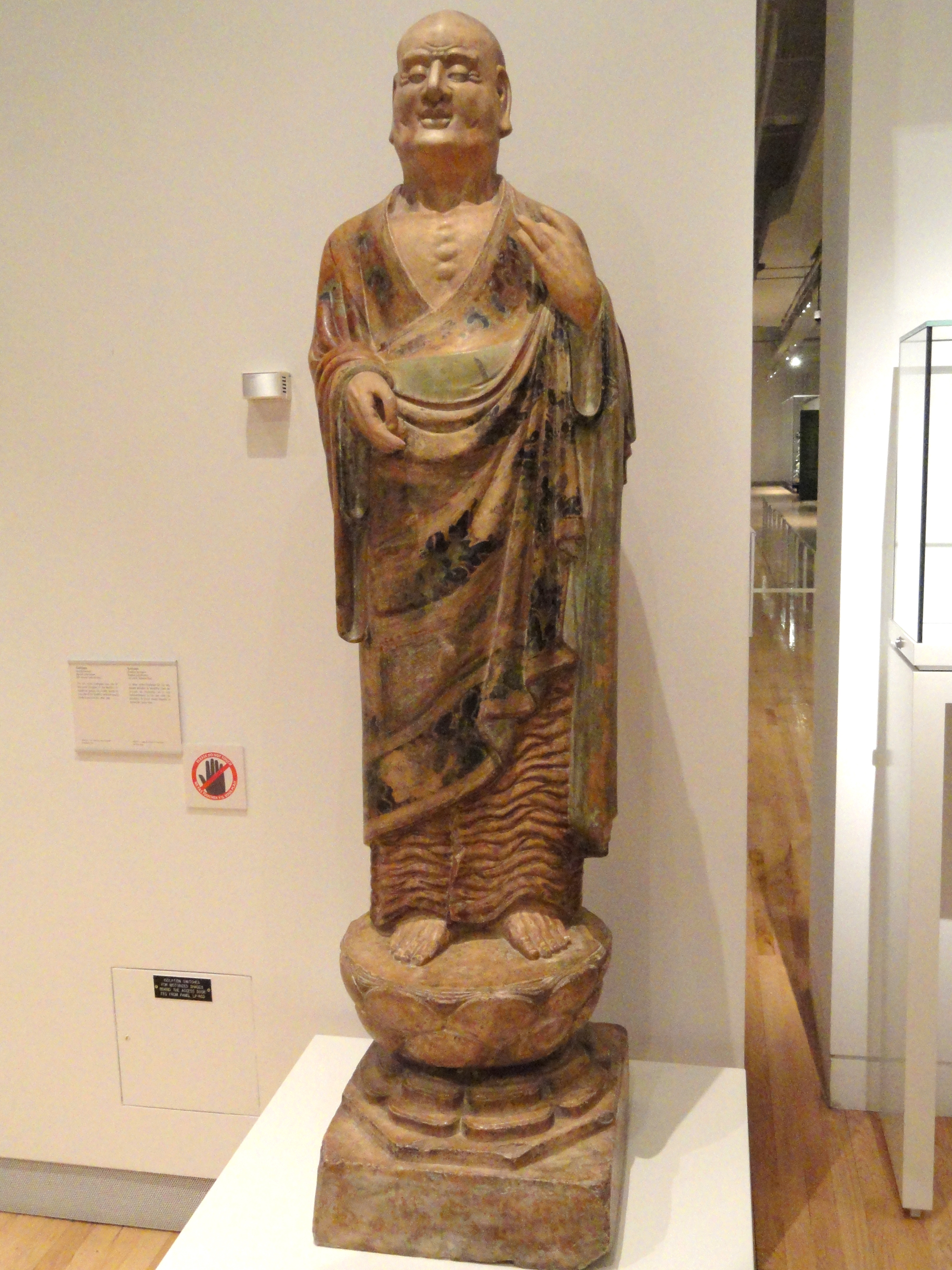
Kashyapa

The Companion Statues on display at the Royal Ontario Museum (ROM) flank a three-metre tall Buddha located in the Southeast Asia Gallery, though actually originating from East Asia in provenance, on the first floor at the very back in the centre of the gallery. The sculptures are from the Tang dynasty period (618–906), probably the 8th century, and appear to come from Shanxi Province, China. They represent two luohans, or disciples of the Buddha. The younger luohan has been at the museum since 1922 and the older was purchased in 1990. Curators have concluded that the two luohans are an original pair, but not a set with the Buddha figure.

== The Aged Luohan (Kashyapa) ==
The older figure represents the luohan Mahākāśyapa (or Kashyapa, Kassapa, or Kasyapa, but not Kashyapa, a figure from Hinduism). The First Buddhist Council began when Mahākassapa asked Ānanda to recite Buddha's discourses.

The Luohan is life-sized and made of marble, sculpted during a time when statues of that size in marble were very rare. It bears a clear resemblance to the younger luohan in size, dress, and medium. The figure is thinner than the younger one, his rib cage being clearly visible beneath his robes. The statue was purchased in good condition, and only the hands needed to be restored.

The piece was acquired in October 1993 from the Christie's Hong Kong Chinese works of art sale. The statue was noticed only three days before the auction, and permission to bid for the Luohan was obtained by a unanimous agreement by the department. The purchase was possible because of the Levy Bequest of 1990.

== The Younger Luohan (Ananda) ==
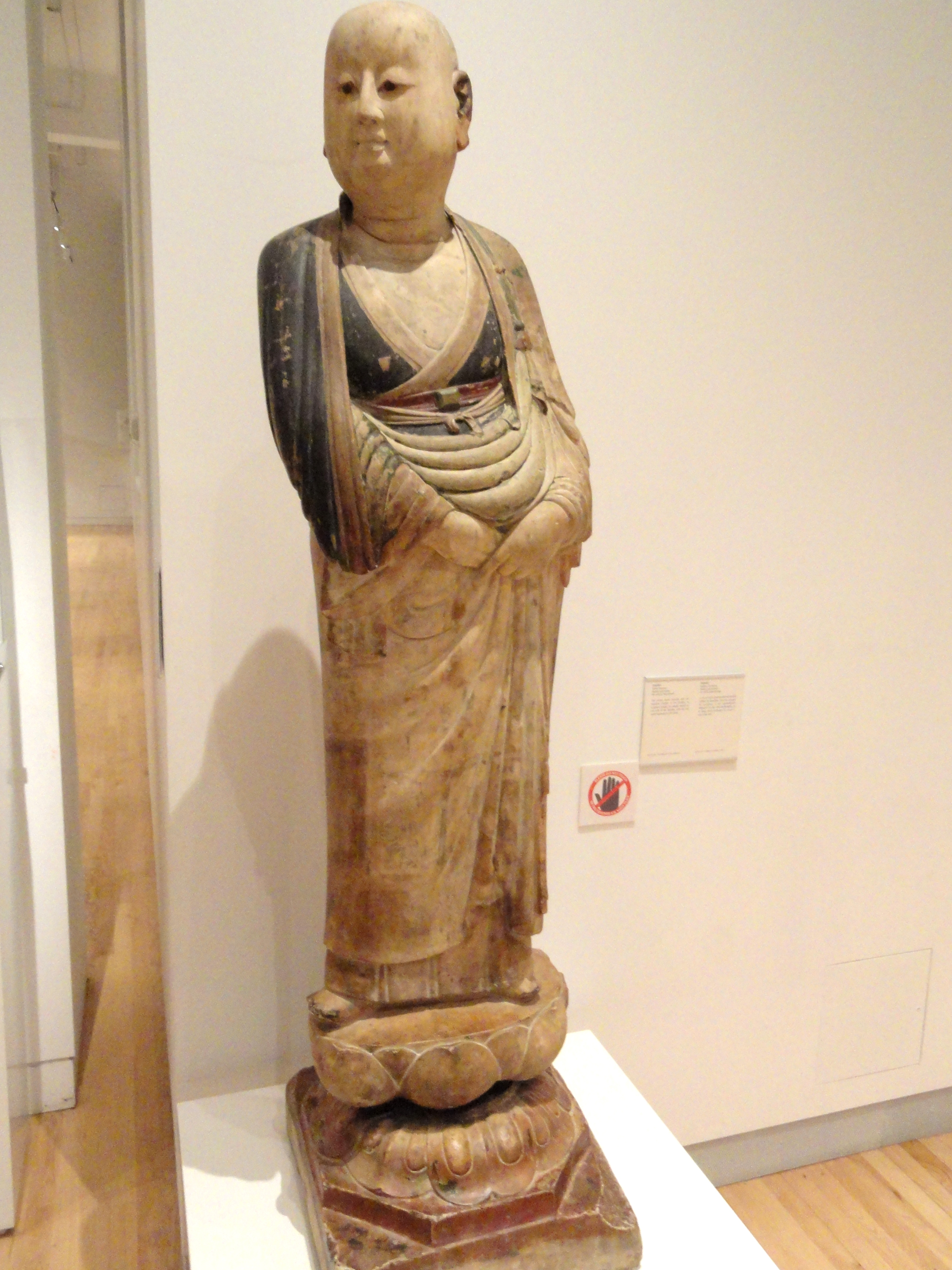
Ananda, Shanxi Province, China, Tang dynasty, 8th century, marble.

The younger Luohan is Ananda, the Buddha's primary attendant. It is unclear if the head was broken off at the neck at some point and replaced, or if it was originally carved separately. It has been suggested that three neck folds give evidence of the head being broken and rejoined in China and reset in the correct place and angle. The luohan is portrayed as fleshy, short-waisted and slightly androgynous with a developing "dowager's hump". The upper ears have been broken and replaced with now-discolored materials.

The statue is on an oval socle carved with lotus petals. There is evidence that the socle was broken off from a lower base at one time and reattached with cement to a different base of an inverted lotus atop a square plinth. There are traces of light green pigment in crevices under the robe and skirt, consistent with Tang and Tang-style paintings. In a photo from the 1920s, the robe still has large patches of what is most likely the original surface. They show designs of lotus, chrysanthemums and a vine pattern. Unfortunately, poor cleaning has left few traces of the original pattern.

The statue was acquired in 1922 for $750 Canadian dollars. It was paid to the Chinese in Mexican silver, due to the lack of trust the Chinese had for paper money. The statue originates from a temple at Yang Ku Hsien (Yangqu Xian, near Taiyuan). This statue has appeared at Expo 67 in Montreal and the Nara National Museum exhibition "Sources of Japanese Buddhist Art" in 1978 before coming to its permanent home at the museum. It is regarded as the ROM's finest Chinese Buddhist sculptures.
