= List of places where Gautama Buddha stayed =

There are various types of places where Buddha stayed. The most important kind are those monasteries which were given for his (or the Sangha's) use. Also, sometimes he was invited to stay in someone's garden or house, or he just stayed in the wilderness (a forest without owner). All these places are located in the Gangetic Plain (located in Northern India and Southern Nepal).

== Monasteries ==
Owned by the Sangha. Originally offered to Buddha and/or the Sangha.

Savatthi:

- Jetavana. The following huts were used by Buddha: Gandhakuti, Kosambakuti
- Pubbarama. Migaramatupasada
- Rajakarama

Rajagaha:

- Veluvana: Kalandakanivapa
- Jivakambavana
- Gijjhakata

Kosambi:

- Kukkutarama
- Ghositarama
- Pavarika-ambavana
- Badarikarama

Vesali:

- Kutagarasala
- Ambavana

Kapilavatthu:

- Nigrodharama

Saketa:

- Kalakarama

== Gardens ==
Buddha used to stay there as a guest in someone's garden or forest

Kosambi:

- Udakavana

Nalanda:

- Pavarika's mango grove

Thullakotthika:

- Koravya's Migacira Park

Kammassadhamma:

- The fire-hut of a brahmin of the Bharadvaja-clan.

== A wilderness area ==
These places had no owner, and generally nobody lived there.

Bodhgaya: - Mahabodhi tree and surroundings

Benares: - Isipatana (Sarnath)

Gaya: - Gayasisa hill

Savatthi: - Andhavana

Kosambi: - Simsapavana

Campa: - Grove of Champaka-trees

Parileyyaka: - Rakkhitavanasanda: Bhaddasala tree

Saketa: - Anjanavana

Vesali: - Beluvagama village

Mathura: - Gundavana

And many other places...

== Status not (yet) sure ==
Mithila:

- Makhadeva ambavana

Alavi:

- Aggalava Cetiya (shrine)

Pataligama:

- Kukkutarama

Bhaddiya:

- Jatiyavana

Kajangala:

- Veluvana
- Mukheluvana

Kimbila:

- Veluvana

Rajagaha (Other places):

- Sítavana
- Pipphaliguha (Pipphali cave)
- Udumbarikáráma
- Moranivápa: Paribbájakáráma
- Tapodarama
- Vediyagiri: Indasálaguhá
- Sattapanniguhá
- Latthivana
- Maddakucchi
- Supatitthacetiya
- Pásánakacetiya
- Sappasondikapabbhára
- the pond Sumágadhá.

Vesali:

- Pátikáráma
- Válikárám
- Udena cetiya
- Gotamaka cetiya
- Sattambaka cetiya
- Bahuputta cetiya
- Sárandada cetiya
- Kapinayha cetiya

== See also ==
- Buddhist pilgrimage sites
- Parikrama
- Yatra

== Sources and References ==
Sutras in the Buddhist Canon often begin with a statement of location, as in this arbitrary example from the "Parābhava Sutta" from the Sutta Nipata:

"Thus have I heard. On one occasion the Blessed One was dwelling at Savatthi in Jeta's Grove, Anathapindika's park." (trans. by Bhikkhu Bodhi)

For more detailed references, try checking the Wikipedia article (if it exists) for the specific location.
