= Nigrodharama =

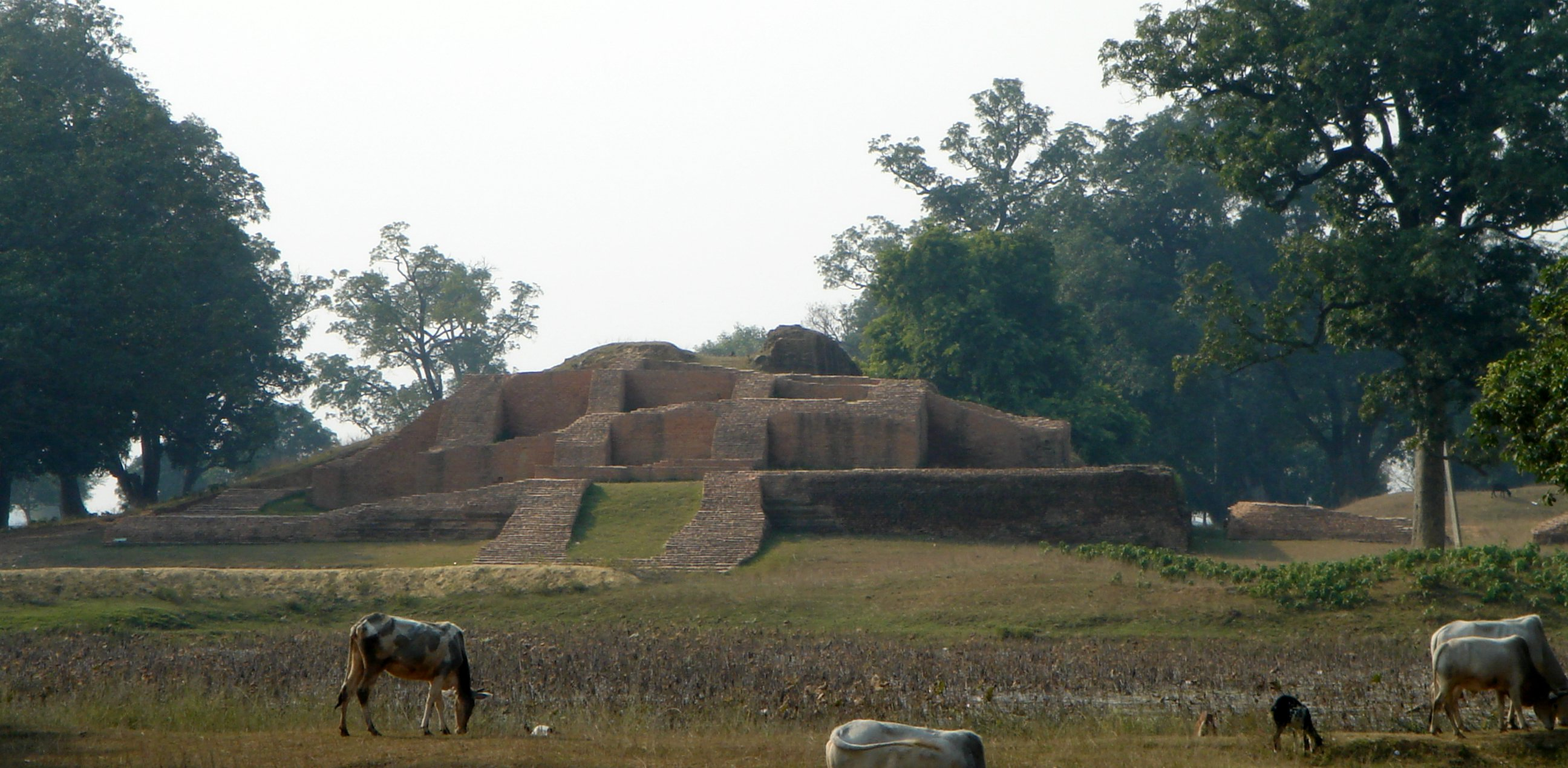
Large stupa at location of Nigrodharama, Nepal

Nigrodhārāma was a Sangharama with a Banyan grove near Kapilavastu, where a residence was provided for the Buddha when he visited the city in the first year after his Enlightenment. It belonged to a Sākyan named Nigrodha, the monk who made Ashoka, the Mauryan Emperor a Buddhist; who gave it to the Monastic Order. The Nigrodharama is located at the site of the modern Kudan village, about six kilometres south of Tilaurakot, the citadel of Kapilavastu. The precise location of Nigrodharama is at the following coordinates: 27.528186°N 83.040757°E.

== Events at the Nigrodharama ==
It was at the Nigrodharama that Mahāpajāpati Gotamī first asked permission for women to enter the Order. This was refused, and from there the Buddha went on to Vesāli.

The Buddha stayed at the Nigrodhārāma on several occasions, and several Vinaya rules are mentioned as being first promulgated there. Various Sākyans came to see the Buddha at the Nigrodhārāma, among them, Mahānāma, Godha, Sarakāni, Nandiya and Vappa.

The Buddha himself visited Kāligodhā during his residence there. It was during a discussion with Mahānāma that the Cula Dukkhakkhandha Sutta was preached. During one of the Buddha's residences in Nigrodhārāma, the Sākyans invited him to consecrate their new Mote Hall, which he did by preaching there far into the night and then asking Moggallāna to continue his discourse. On another occasion the Buddha is mentioned as having spent a period of convalescence at Nigrodhārāma; he was there also when the quarrel broke out between the Sākyans and the Koliyans regarding the water of the Rohinī). It seems to have been the Buddha's custom, when staying at Nigrodhārāma, sometimes to spend the noonday siesta in the Mahāvana (Great Forest) nearby.

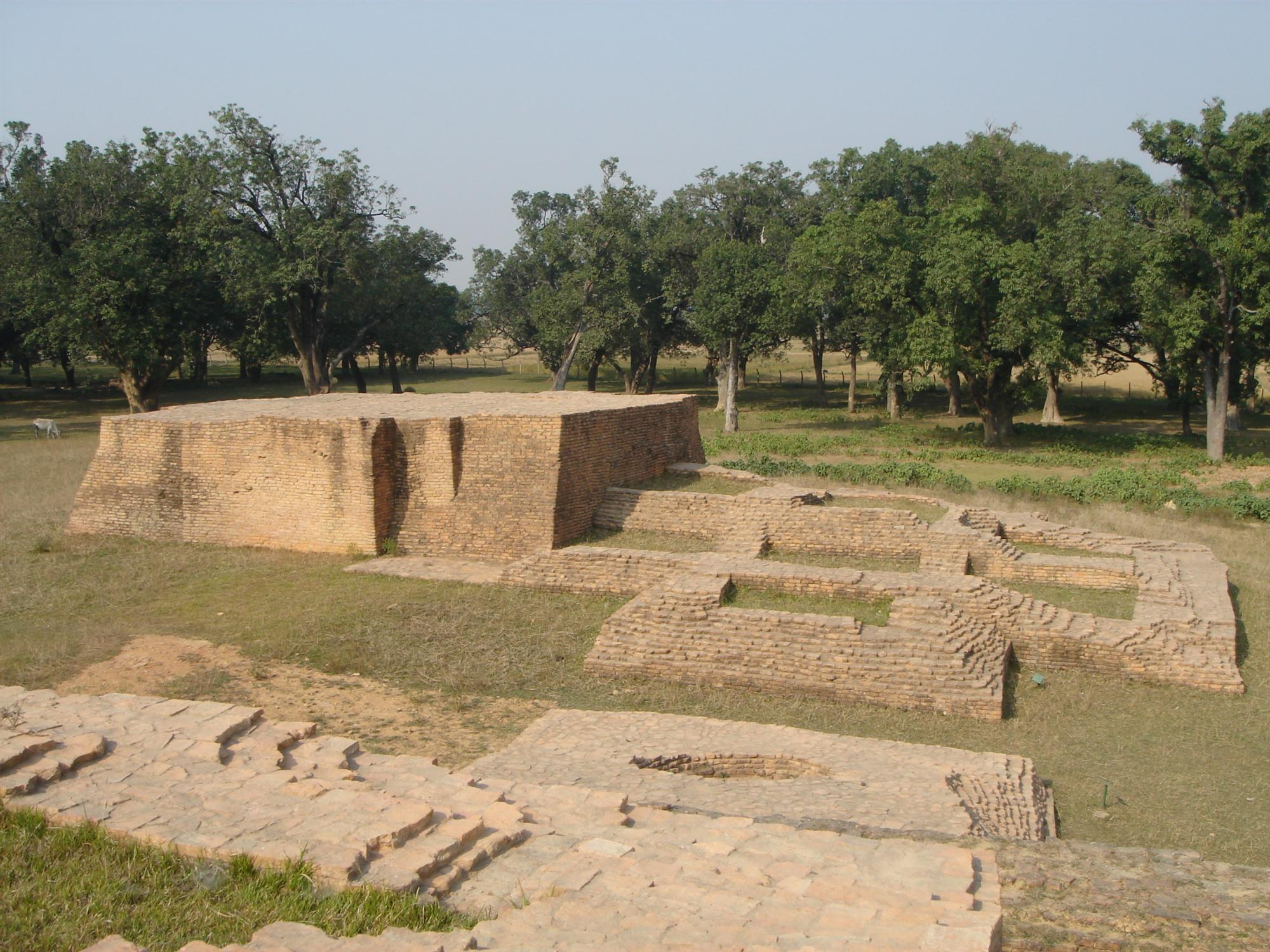
The remains of a second (slightly smaller) stupa at the Nigrodharama

Among others mentioned as having stayed at Nigrodhārāma are Anuruddha and Lomasakangiya; a deva called Candana there taught him the Bhaddekaratta Sutta. This Lomasakangīya might be the same as Lomavangīsa, who is also mentioned as having lived in Nigrodhārāma?

Near Nigrodhārāma was once the site of the dwelling of a hermit (isi) called Kanha. The Buddha, remembering this, once smiled, and, when asked the reason for his smile, related the Kanha Jātaka (J.iv.6).

There is a tradition that the Cariya Pitaka and the Buddhavamsa were preached by the Buddha to Sariputta during his first stay in Nigrodhārāma. It was probably there that Anuruddha's sister built, at his request, an assembly hall of two storeys for the Sangha. Buddhaghosa says that Kāla Khemaka, the Sākyan, built a special vihāra near Nigrodhārāma, on one side of the grounds.

== Current remains of the Nigrodharama ==
The remains of the Nigrodharama are currently called Kudan, because it is located close to Kudan village. The remains consist of two (excavated) large stupas.

== See also ==
- Jetavana
- Places where Buddha stayed
