= Jean Przyluski =

- Born: 17 August 1885; Le Mans, France
- Died: 28 October 1944 (aged 59)
- Occupations: French linguist and scholar of religion

Jean Przyluski (17 August 1885 – 28 October 1944) was a French linguist and scholar of religion and Buddhism of Polish descent. His interests ranged widely through the structure of the Vietnamese language, the development of Buddhist myths and legends, as well as Indo-European folk traditions such as the werewolf cult. In addition, he thought out general theories about the development of religion, which he presented in his magnum opus L'Evolution humaine (1942).

== Bibliography ==
- Renou, Louis. "Jean Przyluski (1885-1944)". In École pratique des hautes études: Section des sciences historiques et philologiques 77 (1946): 5-7
