= Sihahanu =

Ruler of the Shakyas
- Predecessor: Jayasena
- Successor: Śuddhodana
- Consort: Kaccanā of Devadaha
- Issue: Śuddhodana; Dhotodana; Sakkodana; Sukkadana; Amitodana; Amitā; Pamitā
Names
- Sihahanu Jaysena Gautama
- Dynasty: Shakya
- Father: King Jayasena

King Sihahanu (Skt:Sīṃhahanu) was an ancient monarch and paternal grandfather of Gautama Buddha. He was one of the rulers of Shakya Clan. He was also known as shakya.

== Family ==
Sihahanu was a son of King Jayasena and brother of Princess Yasodhara.

He married Kaccanā of Devadaha, daughter of Devadahasakka.

Kaccanā and Sihahanu had these children:

- King Śuddhodana
- Dhotodana
- Sakkodana
- Sukkadana
- Amitodana
- Amitā
- Pamitā

As a young prince, Śuddhodana excelled in warfare and swordsmanship. After a victorious battle, Sihahanu offered him a boon. He requested permission to marry two beautiful sisters, Maya and Mahāpajābatī Gotamī.

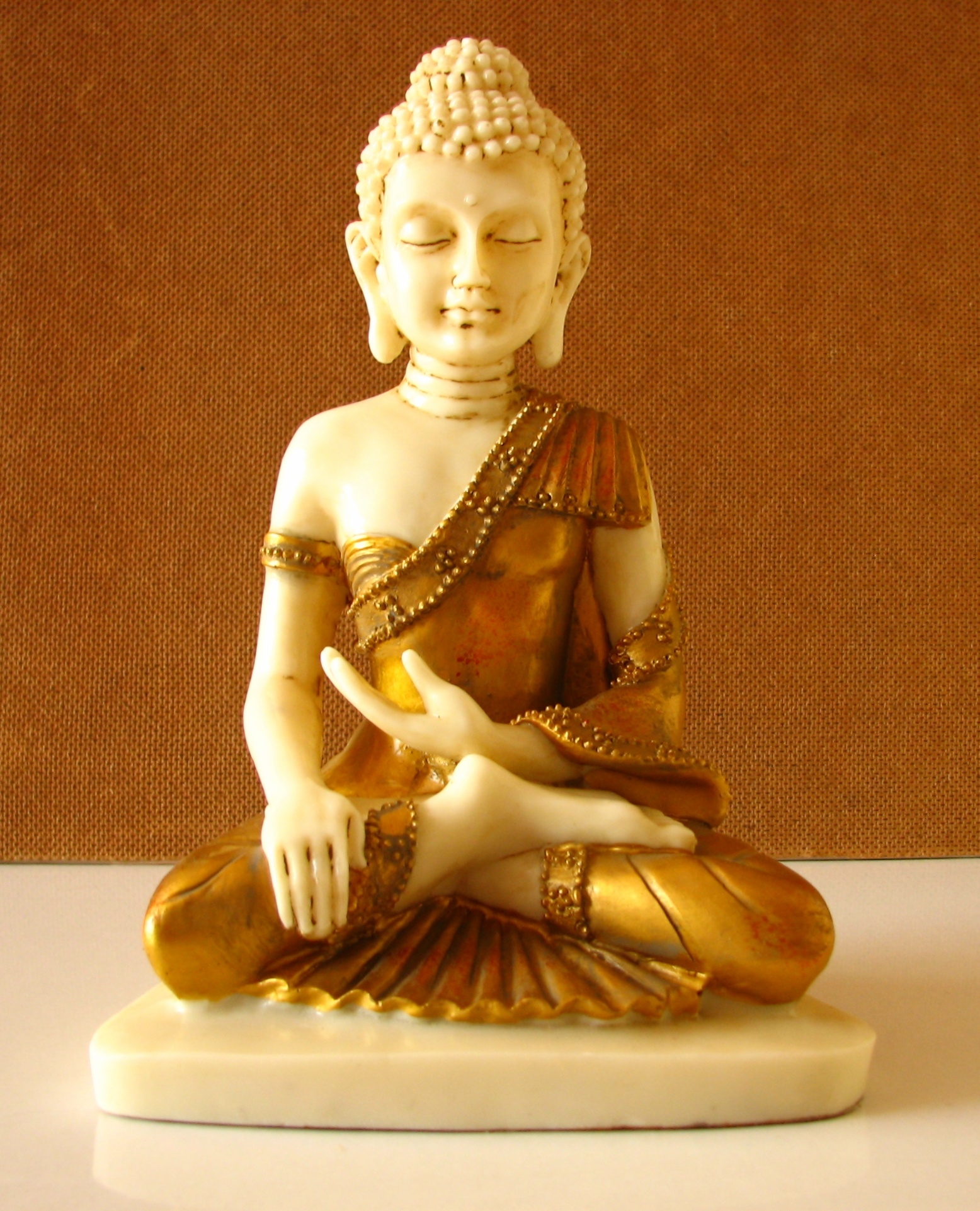
Sihahanuʻs grandson Gautama Buddha
