= Dandapāni =

Dandapani was an ancient Indian king from the Koliya dynasty, who ruled a city called Koli. He was born. He was a brother to Suppabuddha and to his sisters Māyā and Pajāpatī. He was the Buddha's maternal uncle.

== See also ==
- Shakya
- Yasodharā
- Devadatta
- Suppabuddha
