= Suppabuddha =

Father-in-law of Siddhartha Gautama (The Buddha)

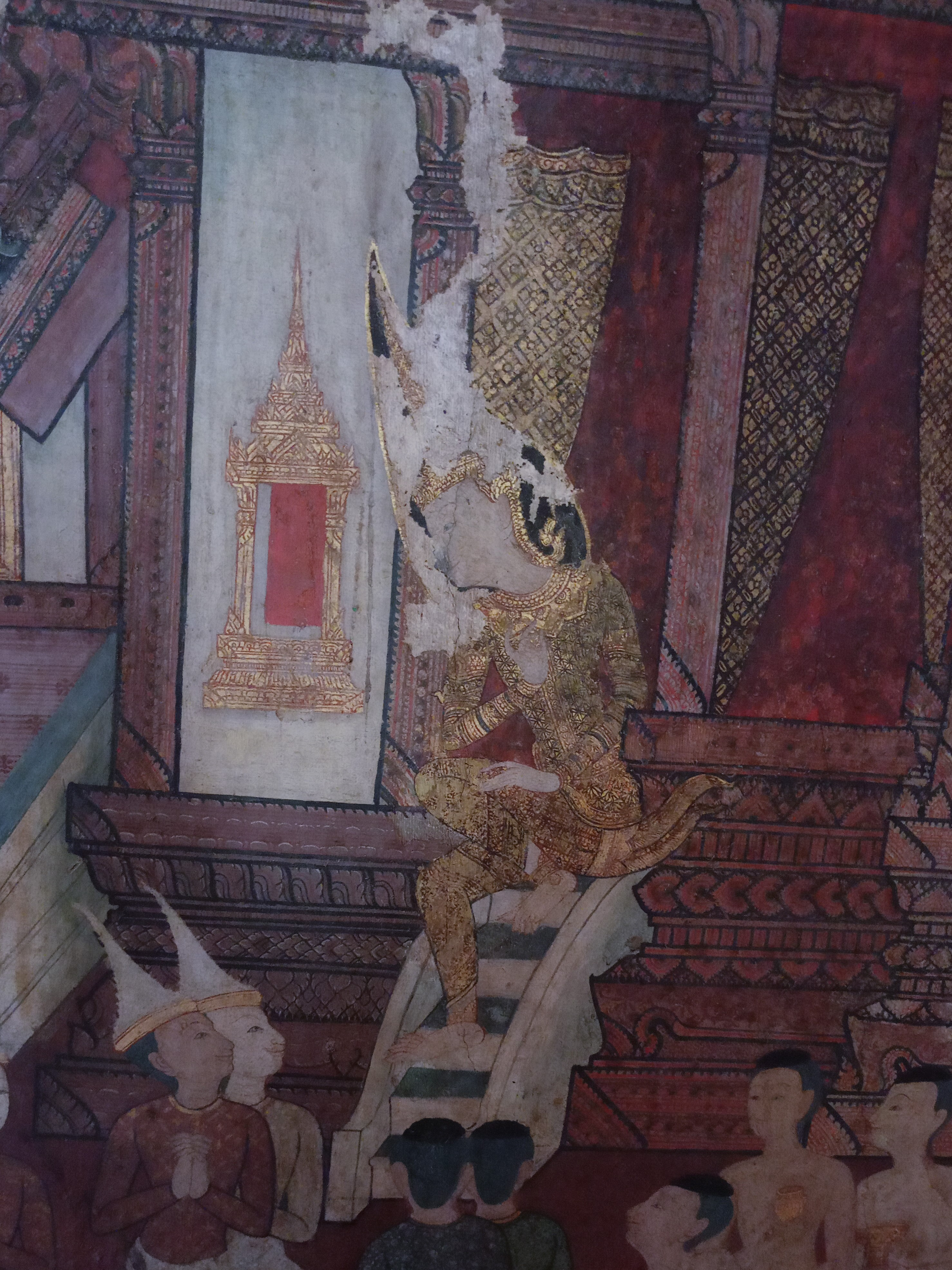
- Siblings: Maya; Mahapajapati Gotami
- Spouse: Amita
- Issue: Yasodhara (daughter); Devadatta (son)
- Father: Añjana
- Mother: Yasodhara

Suprabuddha (Sanskrit), or Suppabuddha (Pali) was the maternal uncle and father-in-law of the Buddha according to the Mahavamsa genealogy and the Theravada commentarial tradition. He was also known as Mahāsuppabuddha.

Suppabuddha is also the name of several other individuals mentioned briefly in the Theravada tradition.

== Sources ==
According to the Mahavamsa, he was the son of king Añjana and his wife Yasodharā. He was the father of both Bhaddakaccānā (Siddhartha's wife Yasodharā) and Devadatta, the Buddha's rival, from his wife Amitā. He had two sisters, Māyā and Pajāpatī and a brother, Dandapāni. As the mother of Buddha was Maya, that made him the uncle of the Buddha, and as his daughter was the wife of the Buddha, he became also the father-in-law to the Buddha.

Western scholars note that the pattern of cross-cousin marriage described in the Mahavamsa genealogy is typical of historical marriage practices in Dravidian societies in Southern India, but not typically associated with Northeast India and the Ganges Basin of the historical Buddha. Thus, the genealogy ascribed to the Buddha by the Mahavamsa may reflect elaboration and interpretation that reflects local traditions rather than historical fact.

According to the Mahāyāna Abhiniṣkramaṇa Sūtra (佛本行集經), Suprabuddha was a wealthy Shākyan who lived in Devadaha. He had eight daughters, the eldest of whom was Māyā and the youngest, Mahāpajāpatī. Both of them married King Shuddhodana. The other six daughters married his three brothers, two sisters to each.

== Life ==
According to the Theravada commentaries, one day, the path leading to the Supreme Buddha and the monks was blocked by the king and his company. The Supreme Buddha saw the evil that was going on and warned three times but did not listen. Buddha later returned with the monks. King Suprabuddha also returned because his wish was granted.

Later, when Ananda Thera inquired about this incident, the Supreme Buddha preached that sending a Buddha back was a great sin. Because of that sin, the king would flee the earth in seven days and go to hell.

Informed of this prediction, the king sealed himself up on a high floor of his palace as a precaution. However, on the seventh day predicted by the Buddha, a horse belonging to the king broke loose and the king went to attempt to calm it. He fell down the stairs and was swallowed by the earth, sharing the same eventual fate as his son, Devadatta.

== Others Named Suppabuddha ==
Suppabuddha the koliyan is one of several individuals by that given name identified in Pali literature. Others include:

- Suppabuddha the Leper, a man born as a leper as punishment for having disparaged a Pratyekabuddha, who became a sotāpanna after hearing Shakyamuni Buddha preach in Rājagaha. He appears in the Udana and his story appears in two different variations, one including the intervention of the god Sakka, in the Udana and Dhammapada commentaries.
- Suppabuddha, son of Vessabhū Buddha in his last lay life.
- An ancient king called Suppabuddha was a former birth of Eraka Thera, a monk mentioned in the Theragatha.
