= Sundari Nanda =

Half-sister of Gautama Buddha

Most venerable bhikkhuni Sundarī Nandā
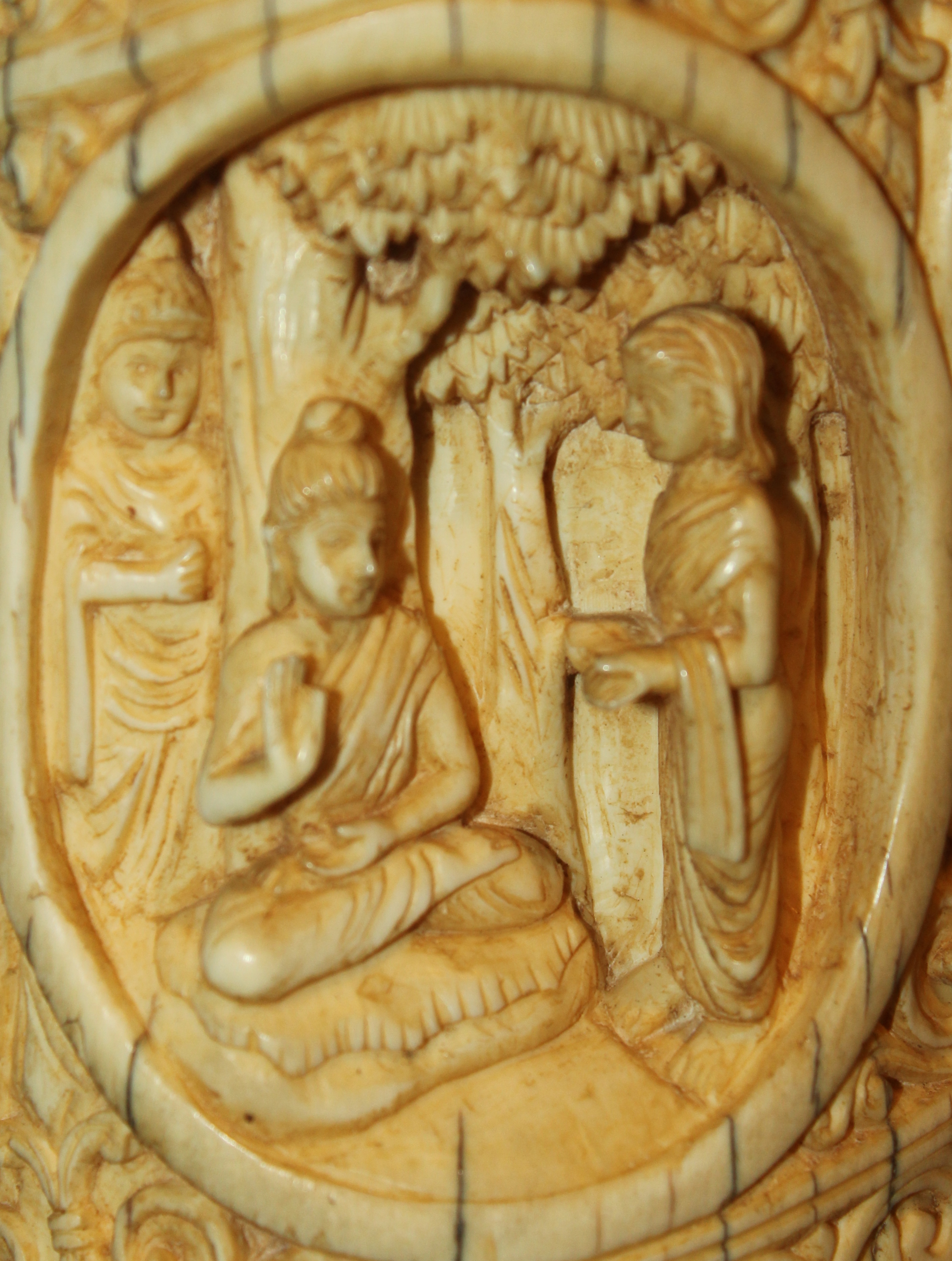
- Buddha stops Nanda, who tried to escape from the Sangha.
- Title: Foremost bhikkhuni in the practise of jhana

Personal life
- Born: 6th century BCE Kapilavastu
- Partner: Prince Nanda
- Parent(s): Shakya King Suddhodhana (father), Queen Maha Pajapati Gotami (mother)
- Dynasty: Shakya Republic
- Other names: Rupa Nanda, Janapada Kalyani
- Occupation: bhikkhuni
- Relatives: Siddhartha (brother) Nanda (brother)

Religious life
- Religion: Buddhism
- Dharma name: Sundarī Nandā theri

Senior posting
- Teacher: Gautama Buddha
- Dynasty: Shakya Republic

Translations of Sundarī Nandā
- English: lit. 'beautiful Nandā'
- Sanskrit: Sundarī Nandā
- Pali: Sundarī Nandā
- Bengali: সুন্দরী নন্দা
- Chinese: 孫陀利難陀 (Pinyin: Sūntuólìnántuó)
- Japanese: 孫陀利難陀 (Rōmaji: Sondarinanda)
- Korean: 손타리난타 (RR: Sondarinanda)
- Sinhala: සුන්දරී නන්දා
- Tagalog: Sundali Nanda
- Thai: รูปนันทาเถรี
- Vietnamese: Tôn-đà-lợi Nan-đà

Princess Sundarī Nandā of Shakya, also known simply as Sundarī, was the daughter of King Suddhodana and Queen Mahapajapati Gotami. She was the half-sister of Siddhartha Gautama, who later became a Buddha. She became a nun after the enlightenment of her half-brother and became an arhat. She was the foremost among bhikkhunis in the practice of jhana (total meditative absorption). She lived during the 6th century BCE in what is now Bihar and Uttar Pradesh in India.

== Early years ==
When she was born, Princess Nandā was lovingly welcomed by her parents: Her father was King Śuddhodana, also the father of Siddhartha; her mother was Mahaprajapati. Mahaprajapati was the second wife of Suddhodana and the younger sister of his first wife, the late Queen Maya. Nanda's name means joy, contentment, pleasure, and was named as her parents were especially joyous about the arrival of a newborn baby. Nanda was known in her childhood for being extremely well-bred, graceful and beautiful. To disambiguate her from Sakyans by the same name, she was also known as "Rupa-Nanda," "one of delightful form," sometimes "Sundari-Nanda," "beautiful Nanda." Since Her beauty sparkled day by day she was later named as "Janapada Kalyani". Over time, many members of her family, the family of the Sakyans of Kapilavastu, left the worldly life for the ascetic life, inspired by the enlightenment of their Crown Prince Siddhartha. Amongst them was her brother Nanda, and her cousins Anuruddha and Ananda, who were two of the Buddha's five leading disciples. According to therigatha she was to get married with her own brother Nanda but before their wedding he had to enter into monastic life.

Her mother, was the first Buddhist nun, having asked the Buddha to allow women into the sangha. As a result of this, many other royal Sakyan ladies, including Princess Yasodharā, the wife of Siddhartha became Buddhist monastics. Thereupon, Nanda also renounced the world, but it was recorded that she did not do it out of confidence in the Buddha and the dharma, but out of blood love for her relatives and a feeling of belonging.

== Renunciation ==
It soon became obvious that Nanda was not fully focused on her life as a nun. Nanda's thoughts were mainly directed centred on her own beauty and her popularity with the people, characteristics which were the karma of meritorious actions in past lives. These karmic traits became impediments to Nanda, since she neglected to reinforce them with new actions. She felt guilty that she was not fulfilling the lofty expectations that others had of her, and that she was far from the objective for which so many of the Sakyan royal family had renounced their worldly life. She was certain that the Buddha would censure her, so she evaded him for a long time.

== Enlightenment ==
One day, the Buddha requested all the bhikkhunis to come to him individually, to receive his teaching, but Nanda did not obey. The Buddha let her be called explicitly, and then she presented herself, in an ashamed and anxious demeanour. The Buddha addressed her and appealed to all of her positive qualities so that Nanda willingly listened to him and delighted in his words. He knew that the conversation had raised her spirits and had made her joyful and ready to accept his teaching. Since Nanda was so preoccupied with her physical beauty, the Buddha used his psychic powers to conjure the vision of a woman more beautiful than Nanda, who then aged quickly and visibly in front of her own eyes. As a result, Nanda could see, in a short time span, what could otherwise only be noticed in humans in a time span of decades: the recession of youth and beauty, the decay, the appearance of aging, such as wrinkles and gray hair. This vision affected Nanda deeply; she was shaken to the core. After having shown Nanda this confronting image, the Buddha could explain the law of impermanence to her in such a manner that she grasped its truth completely, and thereby attained the supreme bliss of nibbana.

Later the Buddha recognised his half-sister as being the foremost amongst bhikkunis who practiced Jhana as she had wished it before Padumuttara Buddha. This meant that she not only followed the analytical way of insight, but emphasised the experience of tranquillity. Enjoying this pure well-being, she no longer needed any sensual enjoyments and soon found inner peace, despite having become a member of the sangha out of attachment to her relatives.

== See also ==
- Mahapajapati Gotami
- Suddhodana
- Gautama Buddha
- Nanda
- Yasodharā

== Bibliography ==
- Hecker, Hellmuth (2006-09-23). "Buddhist Women at the Time of The Buddha". Buddhist Publication Society.
- Keown, Damian (2013). Encyclopedia of Buddhism. Routledge. p. 117. ISBN 9781136985881.
