= Śuddhodana =

Father of the Buddha

Suddhodana
- Ruler of the Shakyas
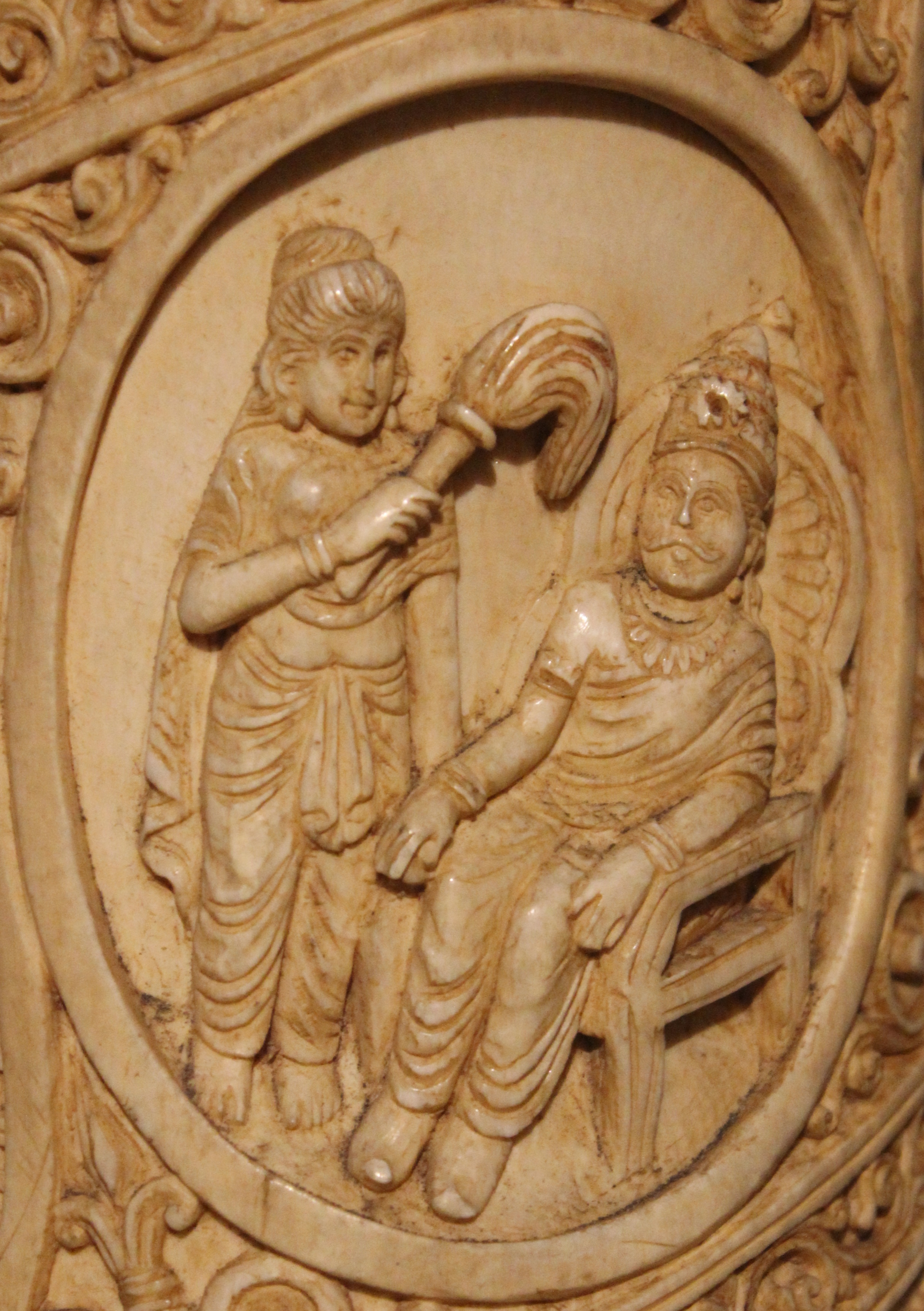
- Predecessor: Sihahanu
- Successor: Mahanama
- Born: Kapilavastu, Shakya (The ancient city of Kapilavastu in present-day Nepal)
- Died: Kapilavastu, Shakya (The ancient city of Kapilavastu in present-day Nepal)
- Spouse: Maya; Mahāprajāpatī Gautamī
- Issue: Siddhartha (son) Sundari Nanda (daughter) Nanda (son)
- Father: Sihahanu
- Mother: Kaccanā

Translations of Śuddhodana
- Sanskrit: शुद्धोदन (IAST: Śuddhodana)
- Pali: Suddhōdana
- Burmese: သုဒ္ဓေါဒန (IPA: [θoʊʔdɔ́dəna̰])
- Japanese: 浄飯王 (Rōmaji: Jōbonou)
- Khmer: សុទ្ធោទនៈ (UNGEGN: Sotthoteakneak)
- Sinhala: සුද්ධෝදන මහ රජතුමා
- Thai: สุทโธทนะ (RTGS: Sutthothana)

Śuddhodana (Sanskrit: शुद्धोदन; Pali: Suddhodana), meaning "he who grows pure rice," was the father of Siddhartha Gautama, better known as the Buddha. He was a leader of the Shakya, who lived in an oligarchic republic, with their capital at Kapilavastu.

In later renditions of the life of the Buddha, Śuddhodana was often referred to as a king, though that status cannot be established with confidence and is in fact disputed by modern scholars.

== Family ==
Śuddhodana's earliest predecessor was King Maha Sammatha (or the first king of the Kalpa). Śuddhodana's father was Sihahanu and his mother was Kaccanā. Śuddhodana's chief consort was Maha Maya, with whom he had Siddhartha Gautama (who later became known as Shakyamuni, the "Sage of the Shakyas", or the Buddha). Maya died shortly after Siddhartha was born, and her sister Mahapajapati Gotami was elevated to chief consort. They had a second son Nanda and a daughter Sundari Nanda. Both of these children eventually became Buddhist monastics.

At the age of 16, Siddhartha married his cousin Yasodharā, the niece of Maha Maya and Mahapajapati. Yasodhara's father is traditionally said to have been Suppabuddha, but by some accounts it was Dandapani.

== Biography ==
=== Questions of royal status ===
Though frequently depicted and referred to as a king, most recent scholarship on the matter refutes the notion that Śuddhodana was a monarch. Many notable scholars state that the Shakya republic was not a monarchy but rather an oligarchy, ruled by an elite council of the warrior and ministerial class that chose its leader or rājā. While the rājā may have held considerable authority in the Shakya homeland, he did not rule autocratically. Questions of consequence were debated in the governing council and decisions were made by consensus. Furthermore, by the time of Siddharta's birth, the Shakya republic had become a vassal state of the larger Kingdom of Kosala. The head of Shakya's oligarchic council, the rājā, would only assume and stay in office with the approval of the King of Kosala.

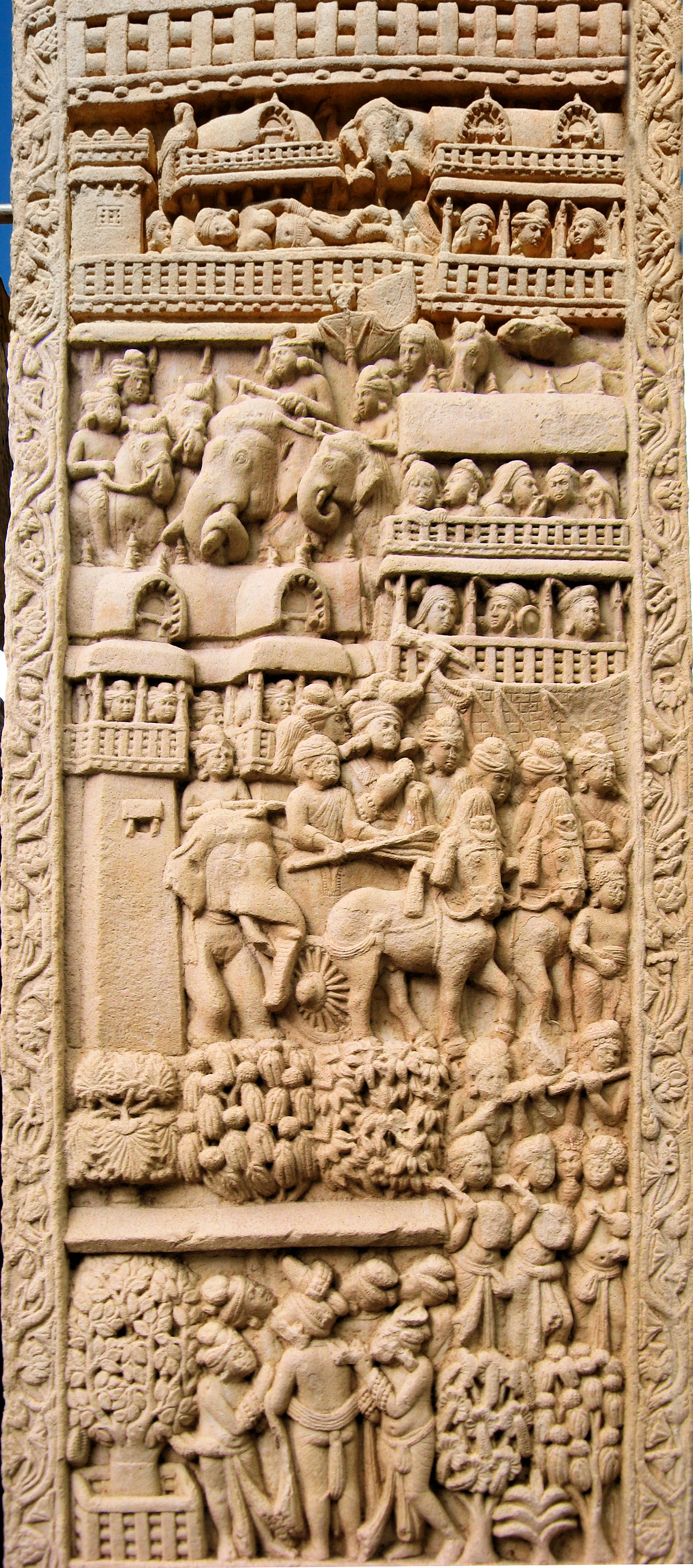
Procession of king Suddhodana from Kapilavastu, proceeding to meet his son the Buddha walking in mid-air (heads raised upwards at the bottom of the panel), and to give him a Banyan tree (bottom left corner). Sanchi.

The earliest Buddhist texts available to us do not identify Śuddhodana or his family as royals. In later texts, there may have been a misinterpretation of the Pali word rājā, which can mean alternatively a king, prince, ruler, or governor. Or as noted in the related article on Buddhism, "Some of the stories about Buddha, his life, his teachings, and claims about the society he grew up in may have been invented and interpolated at a later time into the Buddhist texts."

=== Siddhartha's birth and Great Renunciation ===
Siddhartha Gautama was born in Lumbini and raised in the Shakya capital of Kapilavastu. According to legend, Śuddhodana went to great lengths to prevent Siddhartha from becoming a śramaṇa, including banning him from leaving the palace and surrounding him with women and other sensual pleasures. But at the age of 29, after venturing out of the palace for the first time and experiencing the Four Sights, Siddhartha left his home in search of spiritual answers to the unsatisfactory nature of life, leaving behind his wife Yaśodharā and infant son Rāhula. The story of Siddhartha's departure is traditionally called The Great Renunciation (Mahābhiniṣkramaṇa).

=== Later life ===
Śuddhodana lamented his son's departure and spent considerable effort attempting to locate him. Seven years later, after word of his enlightenment reached Suddhodana, he sent nine emissaries to invite Siddhartha back to the Shakya land. The Buddha preached to the emissaries and their entourage, who joined the sangha.

Śuddhodana then sent a close friend of Siddhartha, Kaludayi, to invite him to return. Kaludayi also chose to become a monk, but kept his word to invite the Buddha back to his home. The Buddha accepted his father's invitation and returned to visit his home. During this visit, he preached the dharma to Śuddhodana.

Four years later, when the Buddha heard of his father's impending death, he once again returned to the palace and preached to Suddhodana, who ultimately achieved arhatship on his deathbed.
