= King Kalābu =

Mythical king in Buddhism

King Kalābu (Sanskrit: Kalāburāja), also known as King Kalinga, King Kalabha or King Kali is a mythical king in Buddhism. His name is extant in both Southern Buddhism and Northern Buddhism. In Chinese he is known as 歌利王 (Gēlì wáng), sometimes rendered 迦蓝浮王 (Jiālánfú wáng) or 卡拉補王 (Kǎlābǔ wáng).

== Jataka tales ==
King Kalābu appears in the Kṣāntivādi Jātaka (Sanskrit; Pali: Khantivādī Jātaka). The Sanskrit word kṣānti (Pali: khanti) means "tolerance" while vādi is a modified form of the word vāda which means "teaching" or "view".

The name "Kṣāntivādin" or "Kṣāntivāda" describes the protagonist of the story: an ascetic who excelled at tolerance in face of the brutal atrocities inflicted upon him by King Kalābu. The Pali version of the tale reveals that King Kalābu was a past birth of Devadatta, the enemy of the Buddha, and that Kṣāntivādin was the Buddha himself in that life.

=== Narrative ===
The story runs as follows:

King Kalābu was ruling the kingdom of Varanasi (modern Benares). One day he set off for sport and recreation with his harem. After playing, the king fell asleep on the lap of one of his concubines. The other members of the harem went off to enjoy the scenery of the garden.

While they were roaming around, they came upon an ascetic meditating under a tree. They approached him and initiated conversation. He preached the Dhamma (law of morality) for them and the audience became immersed in his talk, forgetting about the king. Meanwhile, the king woke up and proceeded to ask his concubine where the other women-folk were. She answered that they were listening to the teachings of an ascetic. The king flew into a rage and departed to look for the ascetic. When he saw that all the women were entranced by the ascetic's sermon, he could not quell his anger. He questioned the ascetic:

"What are you teaching?", asked the king.

The ascetic replied, "I am teaching tolerance."

"What is tolerance?"

"The ability to stay unmoved in the face of atrocities either physical or verbal by others inflicted on oneself."

"Then prove it."

The king ordered his executioner to whip the ascetic. The ascetic was whipped terribly but he did not get angry.

Seeing this, the king asked, "Are you still tolerant?"

The ascetic calmly replied, "Yes, your Majesty."

Then the king ordered his executioner to cut off his various bodily parts. The ascetic bled profusely.

The king finally asked, "Do you still have tolerance?"

The ascetic calmly responded, "Your Majesty, tolerance is not in my bodily parts but it is in my heart. Though you can harm my body, my mind is immovable."

The king had no limit to his anger. He himself stomped on the ascetic's chest, forcing blood to gush from his mouth. Yet, the ascetic remained unmoved. The king's general, who had invited the ascetic to come to the city, came to know about this pathetic situation and ran to the scene.

Seeing the ascetic in this terrible state, he applied some ointment and begged him not to curse the kingdom. The ascetic claimed that he had no ill-will towards the king, but that instead he wished that the king would live for a long time.

This is the story of the past as told by the Buddha. At the end the Buddha declared that this was his perfection of tolerance.

== Moral: Tolerance in this life ==
Once we examine the attitude the Buddha held about the criticism brought against him, his teaching, and community by some of his contemporaries; the perfection of tolerance he carried throughout his many lives of spiritual practice can be better understood. A similar rhetoric used with King Kalābu was applied when the Buddha came to know that Suppiya, an ascetic outside the Buddhist Sangha, criticized the Buddha. Here, the Buddha's admonition reminds us of his previous perfection of tolerance. The discourse from the Brahmajāla Sutta reports the Buddha's words as follows:

"If, bhikkhus, others speak in dispraise of me, or in dispraise of the Dhamma, or in dispraise of the Sangha, you should not give way to resentment, displeasure, or animosity against them in your heart. For if you were to become angry or upset in such a situation, you would only be creating an obstacle for yourselves. If you were to become angry or upset when others speak in dispraise of us, would you be able to recognize whether their statements are rightly or wrongly spoken?"

== Mahayana literature ==
An alternate version of the Jātaka appears in the Mahāvastu.

In the Diamond Sutra, the Buddha refers to King Kalābu and the sage of forbearance as follows:

"Subhūti, the Pāramitā of Forbearance that the Tathāgata speaks of is not a pāramitā of forbearance. Why? Subhūti, this is like in the past when my body was cut apart by the Kalirāja: there were no notions of a self, notions of a person, notions of a being, or notions of a life. In the past, when I was being hacked limb from limb, if there were notions of a self, notions of a person, notions of a being, or notions of a life, then I would have responded with hatred and anger. Remember also that I was the Ṛṣi of Forbearance for five hundred lifetimes in the past. Over so many lifetimes there were no notions of a self, notions of a person, notions of a being, or notions of a life."
