= Sundarānanda =

Son of Suddhodan Shakya

Most Venerable Nanda Thera
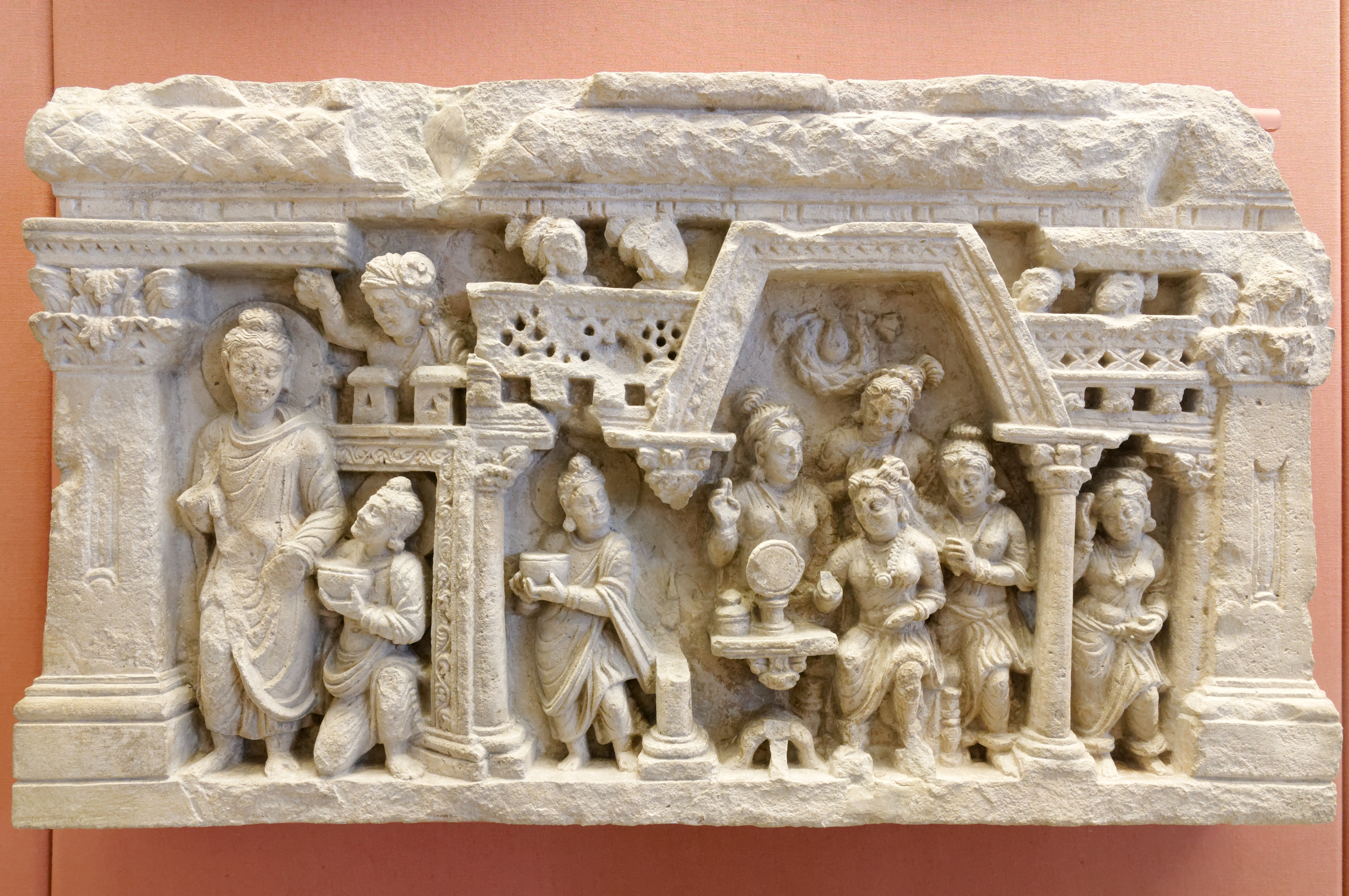
- Nanda Shakya, enticed by the Buddha to leave his bride-to-be and become a monk.
- Title: Indriyēsu Guttadvarānan

Personal life
- Born: Kapilavatthu
- Partner: Janapada Kalyāni
- Parent(s): Shakya King Suddhodhana (father), Queen Maha Pajapati Gotami (mother)
- Occupation: bhikkhu
- Relatives: Siddhartha (brother) Sundari Nanda (sister)

Religious life
- Religion: Buddhism
- Dharma name: Nanda

Senior posting
- Teacher: Gautama Buddha

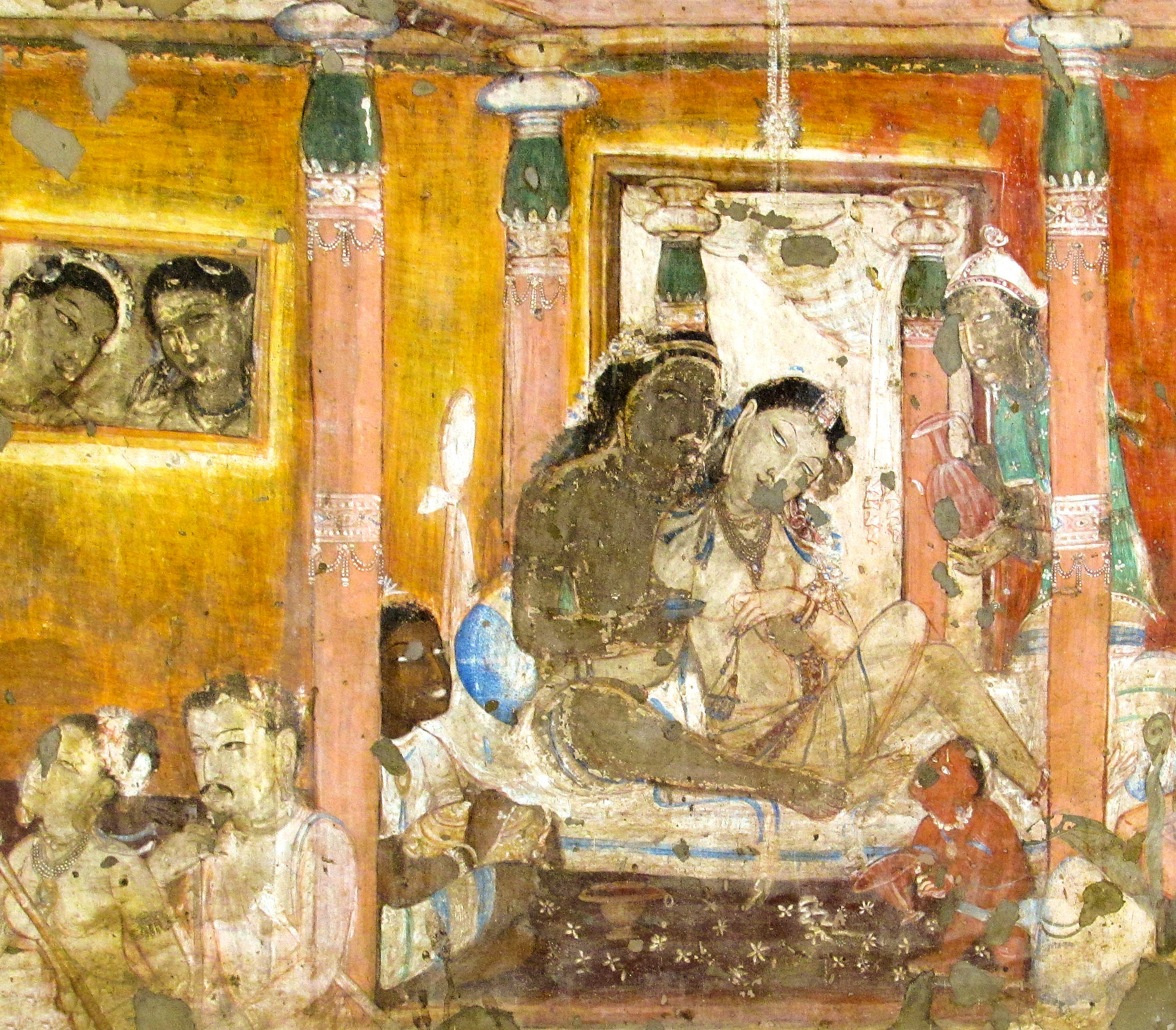
Palatial life of Nanda before conversion, veranda of Cave 17 of Ajanta Caves.

Prince Nanda Shakya, also known as Sundarananda Shakya (handsome Nanda), was the younger half-brother of Gautama Buddha. He shared the same father as Buddha, King Śuddhodana, and his mother, Mahapajapati Gotami, was the Buddha's mother's younger sister. Nanda also had an older sister named Sundari Nanda.

It was seven years after his Enlightenment that the Buddha, at the request of his father, who missed him dearly, returned to his home city of Kapilavatthu.

On the third day of his return, the Buddha, after partaking of his meal, silently handed his bowl to Nanda, rose, and exited. Thinking that the Buddha would take his bowl back, Nanda followed him until he reached the Park of Nigrodha, where the Buddha was staying. This was the Buddha's silent demonstration of the Dhamma to his younger brother, a scene which is often represented in Greco-Buddhist art.

When they arrived at the Park, the Buddha questioned Nanda regarding whether he might become a monk. Although Nanda was about to wed a beautiful woman (Janapada Kalyāni) that same day, he took ordination and joined the community of Monks.

However, Nanda Shakya enjoyed no spiritual happiness. His thoughts were constantly directed towards Janapada Kalyāni and his heart pined for her.

Learning of this, the Buddha took Nanda on a journey to Tavatimsa Heaven or Trāyastriṃśa. On the way Nanda saw a she-monkey that had lost her ears, nose, and tail in a fire, clinging to a charred stump. When they reached the heaven abode, Nanda saw beautiful celestial nymphs and the Buddha asked Nanda: "Which do you consider more beautiful? Those nymphs or Janapada Kalyāni?"

Nanda replied: "Venerable Sir, Janapada Kalyāni looks like the scalded she-monkey, compared to those nymphs."

The Buddha said: "Nanda, can you see that what you thought to be exceedingly beautiful now pales in comparison to greater beauty?"

Upon hearing this, Nanda practiced diligently with the object of winning the celestial nymphs. However, when the other monks learned of Nanda's wish they ridiculed him and he eventually saw his motive as a base, and renouncing desire, attained Arhatship.

There is a poem in Theragatha collection of verses believed to have been authored by Nanda praising the Buddha for having become an arahant.

Abeysekera writes: "On realizing the exquisite happiness of Nibbana, Nanda approached the Buddha and thanked Him respectfully by saying, "Lord I release you from your promise of celestial bliss." The Buddha then informed Nanda that He had been released from the promise the moment he had reached the supreme bliss of Nibbana, because the bliss of Nibbana was greater and transcended any celestial bliss."

== See also ==
- Ānanda his cousin
- Rāhula his nephew
