= Devdaha =

Historical city in Rupandehi District of Lumbini Province, Nepal

Devdaha देवदह
- Municipality (नगरपालिका)
- Location in Nepal Devdaha (South Asia)
- Coordinates: 27.661°N 83.566°E
- Country: Nepal
- Province: Lumbini
- District: Rupandehi

Government
  - Mayor: Dhurba kharel
  - Deputy Mayor: Bidya Laxmi Gurung

Area
  - Total: 136.95 km^{2} (52.88 sq mi)

Population (2011)
  - Total: 53,523
  - Density: 390.82/km^{2} (1,012.2/sq mi)
- Time zone: UTC+5:45 (NST)
- Area code: 071
- Website: www.devdahamun.gov.np

Devdaha (Deva Daha, देवदह) is a municipality in Rupandehi District of Nepal, the ancient capital of Koliya Republic, located 7 km east of Lumbini and east of Butwal and shares a border with Nawalparasi district on the east side. It is identified as the maternal home of Queen Mayadevi, Prajapati Gautami and Princess Yasodhara. There are many places to visit in Devdaha. It is believed that Prince Siddhartha had spent some years of his childhood with his step-mother/aunt Prajapati Gautami in Devdaha.

== History ==
Devdaha was a township of the Koliya in what is now the Rupandehi District of Nepal. The Gautama Buddha stayed there during his tours and preached to the monks on various topics. According to the Commentaries, it was the city of birth of the Buddha's mother (Mayadevi), and of Pajāpatī Gotamī and their companions (Koliyans), who married the Sākiyans of Kapilavatthu.

== Origin of the name ==
In Sanskrit Language, Deva means god and Daha means a pond hence the literal meaning of Devadaha is "pond of the gods". It is believed that the gods and goddesses and saints bathed in this pond. Prince Siddartha himself is believed to have bathed in this holy pond during his visit here in Devadaha. Because it came into existence without human intervention, hence divine (Pali: sayañjāto vā so daho, tasmā pi Devadaho) and the water of this holy pond was supplied in the Koliya Palace. The ancient Koliya Kingdom and present Devdaha received its name Devdaha from this very holy pond.

According to the Buddhist text Dulva (Rockhill, p. 12), the city was founded by Shākyans from Kapilavastu, when they grew very numerous. The spot was pointed out by a deva, hence its name.

== Tourism Place ==
=== Pakari Tree-Kabro (पाकरी वृक्ष) ===
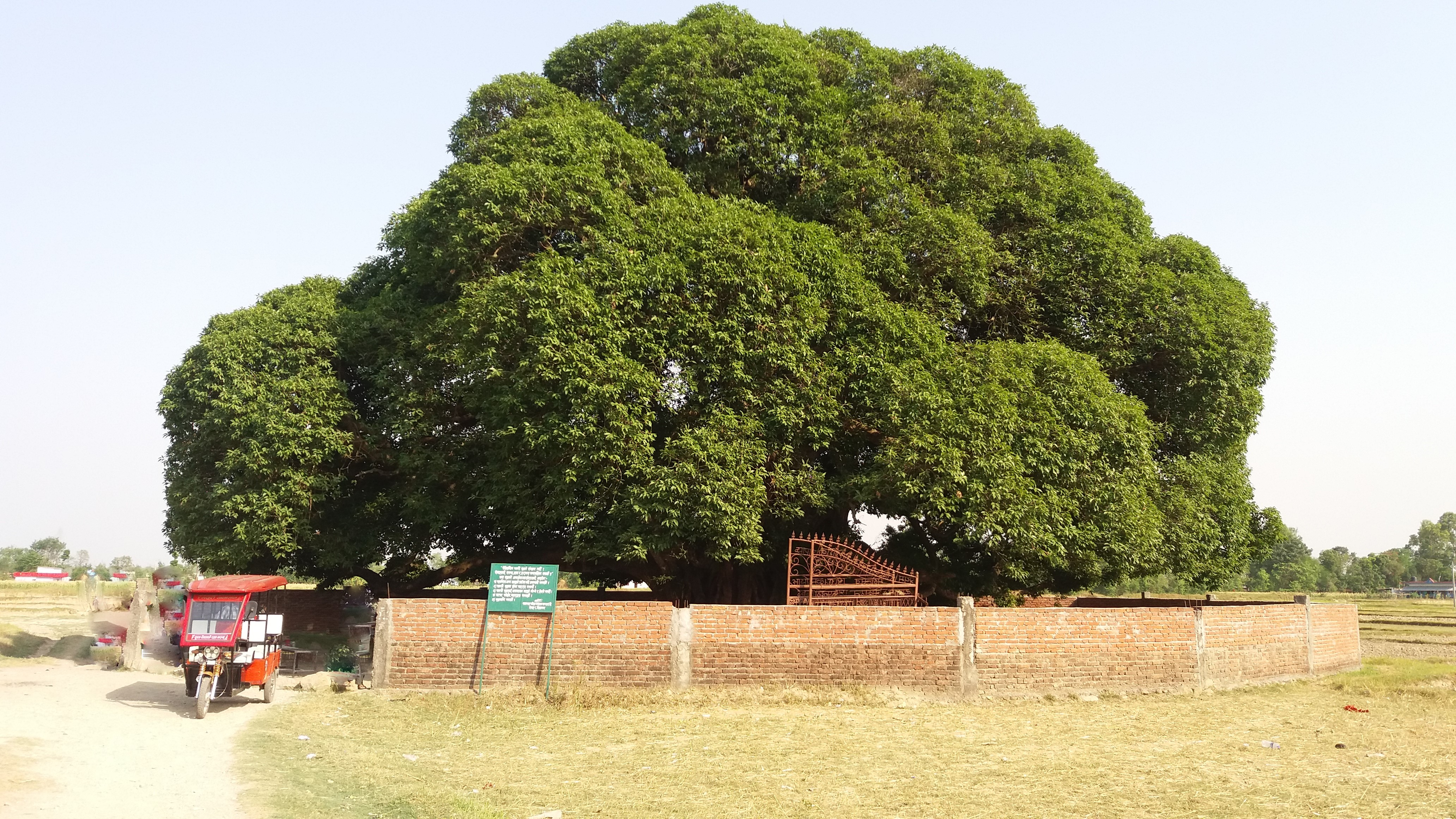
Pakari Tree

Pakari Brikshya is peepal family known as Nepali Kabro Tree from the Ficus family 'weeping fig' (Ficus benjamina is the scientific name). The evergreen tree has a trunk of about 82 ft. circumference and height of about 96 ft. The branches are widespread, creating a circumference of about 500 ft, and it is believed to be one of the biggest trees in Asia. The Pakari Tree is a giant and is considered to be a holy tree. There are many myths and beliefs related to this tree. According to the locals, the large Pakari Tree dates to the time of the Shakyas. The fact that birds never nest on it, vultures and crows never perch on it, and elephants never go near it, amazes the people. Its unique structure and public belief of the historical relation to the period of Buddha, has made it a famous external and internal tourist attraction spot in the last few decades. Pakari Tree can be reached in a 5-minute drive from 'Khaireni bazar' to its south.

=== Bhawanipur(भवानीपुर) ===
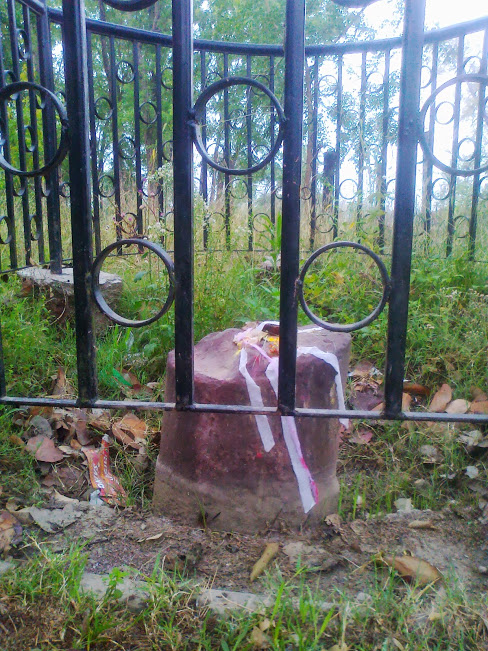
Pillar in Bhawanipur Rupandehi.

The historical site of Bhawanipur, also known as Devidamar, is located 4 km south of Mahendra Highway at Devdaha Municipality Ward No. 4. It is believed to have been ancient Devdaha, capital of the Koliya. The site consists of a temple dedicated to Queen Mayadevi and other archaeological sites. Significant religious and archaeological and objects here include a long stone column (considered by some to be an Ashoka Pillar), stone image of Sun God, ancient brick well etc. Structural walls of ancient constructions are visible even at the surface level here.

=== Kanya Mai Temple(कन्या माइ मन्दिर ) ===
Located at Devdaha Municipality just 1 km south from the junction of Shitalnagar, the Kanya Mai Temple is believed to be built in the memory of Queen Prajapati Gautami, the step mother of Buddha. Major images found in the temple, include standing image of Lokeshwore holding Lotus flower in one hand, while the other is broken off, and many stone idols. Ancient potteries are still visible on the nearby mound. Excavation carried out by the Department of Archaeology and LDT have uncovered several structural ruins and stone antiquities at these sites.

The structures of traditional palace and well also have been uncovered during the excavation of 2011 AD.

=== Devdaha Park ===
Prince Siddhartha was born in Lumbini while Queen Maya Devi was on her way to Devdaha. Queen Maya Devi died on the seventh day of Siddhartha's birth. He was then brought up by his second mother, Queen Prajapati Gautami. During his childhood, Prince Siddhartha paid several visits to Devdaha. After seven years of his Enlightenment, Prince Siddhartha – now Gautama Buddha – again visited Devdaha and was greatly welcomed there.

This Park is the eastern front gate of Devdaha. It contains a huge garden and a pagoda. There is a big statue of Buddha (7 feet or 2.1 metres) and a gilded statue of Sariputra. The garden contains various flowers including bodhi brichha. The park was built by Devdaha Conservation Academy, and it was inaugurated by Former Crown Prince of Nepal Paras Bir Bikram Shah Dev. This park is the entrance and the symbol of peace in Devdaha. Previously due to lack of advertisement, people used to get confused about this place, but nowadays this problem has been solved.
