= Maya (mother of the Buddha) =

Queen of Shakya and mother of the Buddha

- Queen consort of Shakya
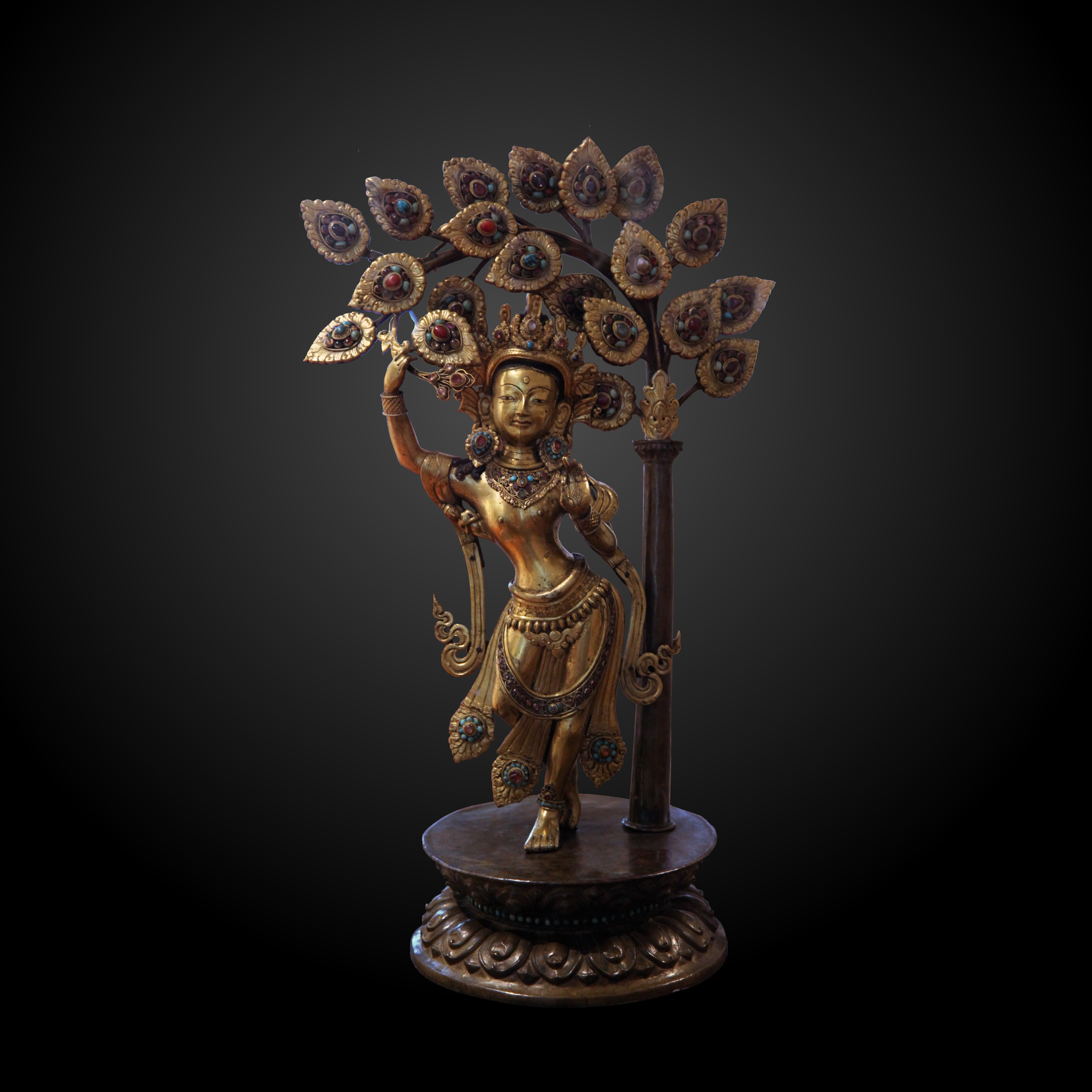
- Statue of Queen Māyā, from Nepal, 19th century. Musée Guimet, Paris
- Predecessor: Kaccanā
- Successor: Mahapajapati Gotami
- Born: Devdaha, Koliya Kingdom
- Died: Kapilavastu, Shakya Kingdom
- Spouse: Śuddhodana
- Issue: Siddhartha Gautama
Names
- Mahamaya
- Dynasty: Shakya Republic
- Father: Anjana
- Mother: Sulakṣañā
- Relatives: Suppabuddha and Dandapāni (brothers), five sisters including Mahapajapati Gotami

Maya (/ˈmɑːjə/; Devanagari: माया, IAST: māyā), also known as Mahāmāyā and Māyādevī, was Queen of Shakya and the mother of Siddhartha Gautama, better known as the Buddha. She was the wife of Śuddhodana, the king of the Shakya kingdom. She died days after giving birth and the Buddha was raised by her sister, Mahāpajāpatī Gotamī, who became the first Buddhist nun ordained by the Buddha.

In the Buddhist commentaries, Maya was on a traditional journey to her familial home in Devadaha where she would give birth, but her labor started as they were in Lumbini. The Buddha was then born in the gardens and Maya died soon after the birth of the Buddha, generally said to have been seven days afterwards.

Maya was then reborn, or came to life again, in a Buddhist heaven, a pattern that is said to be followed in the births of all Buddhas. Thus Maya did not raise her son, who was instead raised by her sister and his maternal aunt, Mahapajapati Gotami. Maya would, however, on occasion descend from Heaven to give advice to her son.

Māyā (माया) means "skillful creator" in Sanskrit. Māyā is also called Mahāmāyā (महामाया, "Great Māyā") and Māyādevī (मायादेवी, "Queen Māyā"). In Chinese, she is known as Móyé-fūrén (摩耶夫人, "Lady Māyā"), in Tibetan she is known as Gyutrulma and in Japanese she is known as Maya-bunin (摩耶夫人). Also, in Sinhalese she is known as මහාමායා දේවී (Mahāmāyā Dēvi). In Burmese, she is known as Médaw Maya (မယ်တော်မာယာ, Mother Māyā), Maya Dewi (မာယာဒေဝီ, Māyādevī), Mé Maya (မယ်မာယာ, Lady Māyā), Mahamaya (မဟာမာယာ) and Thiri Mahamaya Dewi (သီရိမဟာမာယာဒေဝီ, Srī Mahāmāyā Devī).

== Iconography ==
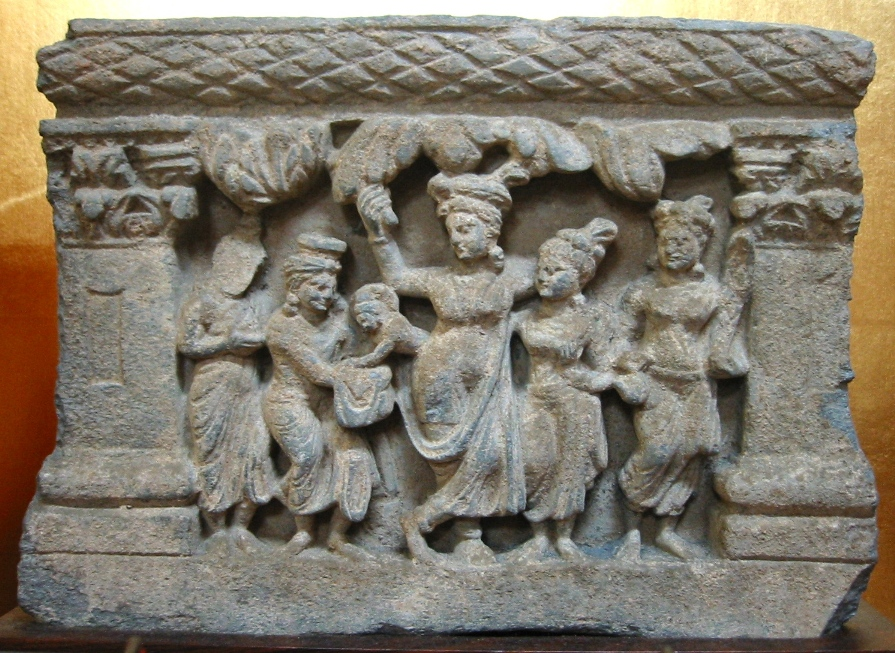
The birth of Siddhārtha Gautama Buddha, Gandhara, 2nd–3rd century CE

In Buddhist literature and art, Queen Maya is portrayed as a very beautiful fecund woman in the prime of life.

Her beauty sparkles like a nugget of pure gold.
She has perfumed curls like the large black bee.
Eyes like lotus petals, teeth like stars in the heavens.
— From the Lalitavistara Sūtra

Although sometimes shown in other scenes from her life, such as having a dream foretelling her pregnancy with Gautama Buddha or with her husband King Śuddhodana seeking prophecies about their son's life, shortly after his birth, she is most often depicted whilst giving birth to Gautama, an event that is generally accepted to have taken place in Lumbini in modern-day Terai. Maya is usually shown giving birth standing under a tree and reaching overhead to hold on to a branch for support. Buddhist scholar Miranda Shaw, states that Queen Maya's depiction in the nativity scene follows a pattern established in earlier Buddhist depictions of the tree spirits known as yaksini.

== Life of Maya ==
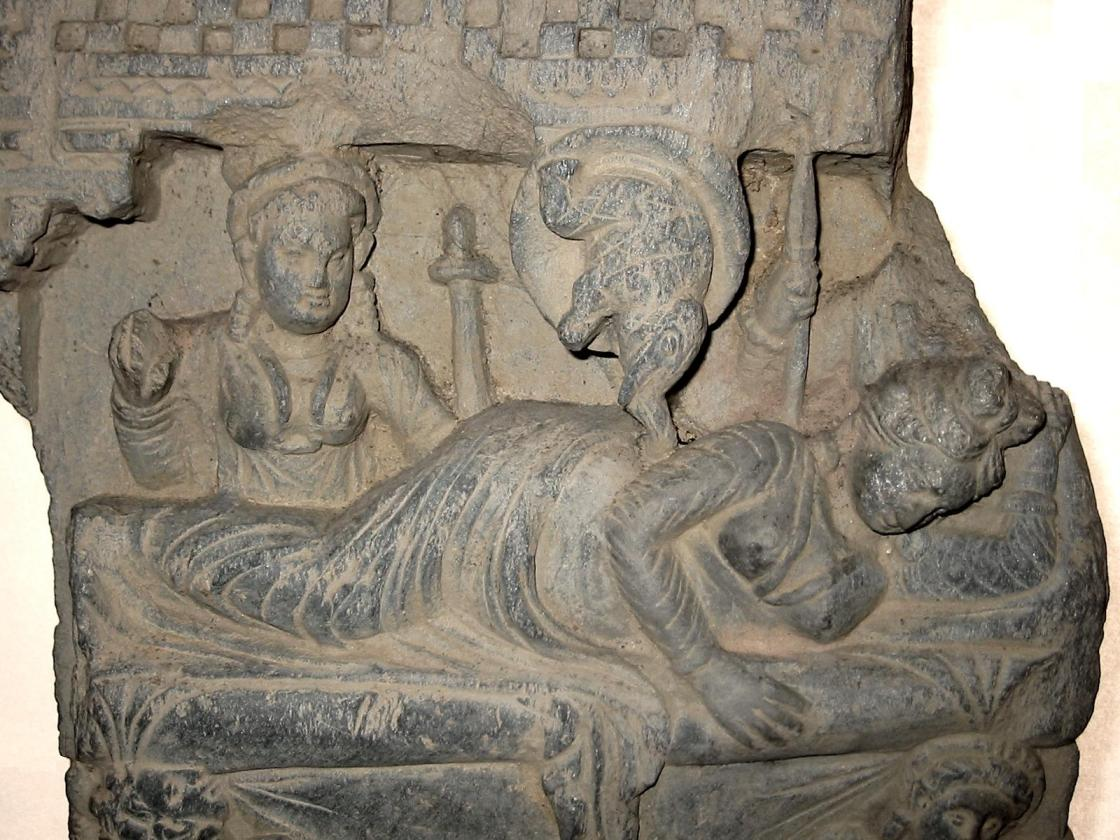
Queen Māyā's white elephant dream, and the conception of the Buddha. Gandhara, 2nd–3rd century CE

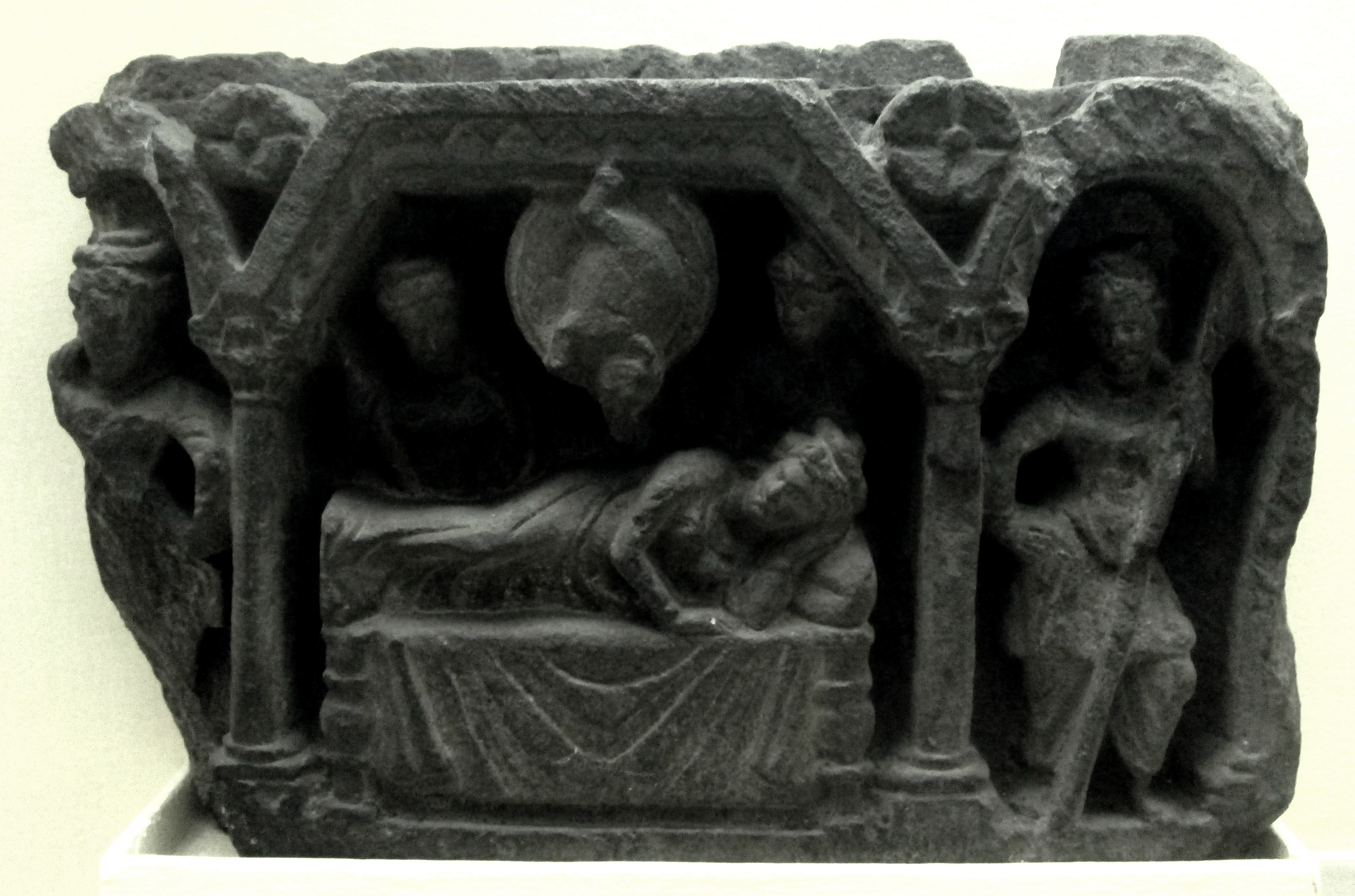
Dream of Mayadevi, Mardan

Māyā married King Śuddhodana (Pāli: Suddhodana), the ruler of the Śākya clan of Kapilvastu. She was the daughter of King Śuddhodhana's uncle and therefore his cousin; her father was king of Devadaha.

According to legend, one full moon night, sleeping in the palace of her husband Śuddhodana, the queen had a vivid dream. She felt herself being carried away by four devas (spirits) to Lake Anotatta in the Himalayas. After bathing her in the lake, the devas clothed her in heavenly cloths, anointed her with perfumes, and bedecked her with divine flowers. Soon after a white elephant, holding a white lotus flower in its trunk, appeared and went round her three times, entering her womb through her right side. Finally the elephant disappeared and the queen awoke, knowing she had been delivered an important message, as the elephant is a symbol of greatness.

According to Buddhist tradition, the Buddha-to-be was residing as a bodhisattva in the Tuṣita heaven, and decided to take the shape of a white elephant to be reborn on Earth for the last time. Māyā gave birth to Siddharta c. 563 BCE. The pregnancy lasted ten lunar months. Following custom, the Queen returned to her own home for the birth. On the way, she stepped down from her palanquin to have a walk under the Sal tree (Shorea robusta), often confused with the Ashoka tree (Saraca asoca), in the beautiful flower garden of Lumbini Park, Lumbini Zone, Nepal. Maya Devi was delighted by the park and gave birth standing while holding onto a sal branch. Legend has it that Prince Siddhārtha emerged from her right side. It was the eighth day of April. Some accounts say she gave him his first bath in the Puskarini pond in Lumbini Zone. But legend has it that devas caused it to rain to wash the newborn baby. He was later named Siddhārtha, "He who has accomplished his goals" or "The accomplished goal".

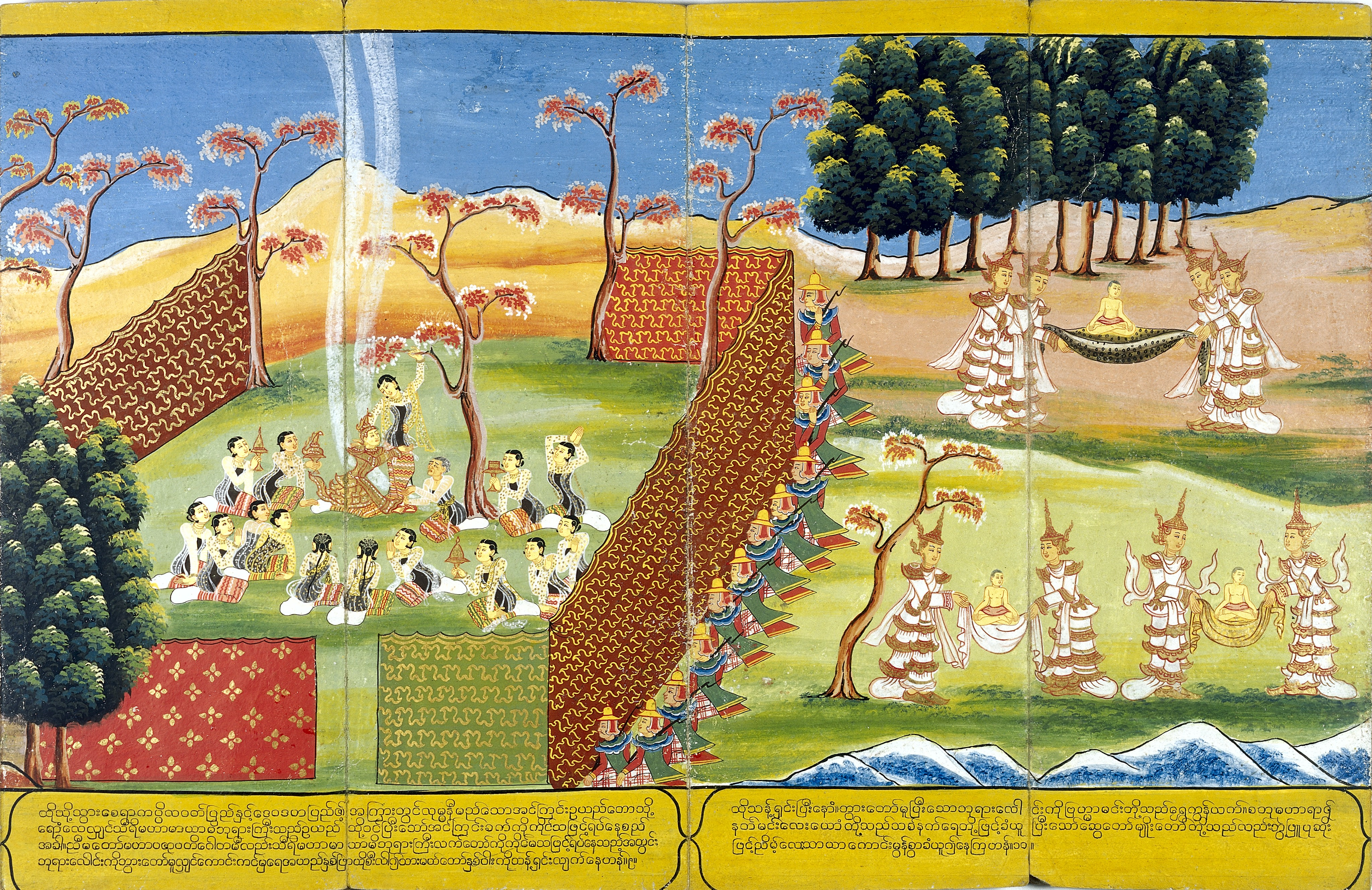
19th century Burmese painting of Mayadevi (left) and the Bodhisatta. (Right) The Bodhisatta is received by Brahmas in a golden net, Devas in a leopard skin and human princes in a white cloth

Scholars generally agree that most Buddhist literature holds that Queen Māyā died seven days after the Buddha's birth; she was reborn as a male deva named Māyādevaputta in the Tusita heaven (according to some commentaries) or Tāvatiṃsa (in others). Seven years after the Buddha's enlightenment, she came down to visit Tavatimsa Heaven, where the Buddha later preached the Abhidharma to her. Her sister Prajāpatī (Pāli: Pajāpatī or Mahāpajāpatī Gotamī) became the child's foster mother.

After Siddhartha had attained Enlightenment and become the Buddha, he visited his mother in heaven for three months to pay respects and to teach the Dharma.

== Cross-cultural analogies ==
Some parallels have been drawn with the birth story of the Buddha and Jesus. Z. P. Thundy has surveyed the similarities and differences between the birth stories of Buddha by Maya and Jesus by Mary and notes that while there may have been similarities, there are also differences, e.g. that Mary outlives Jesus after raising him, but Maya dies soon after the birth of Buddha, as all mothers of Buddhas do in the Buddhist tradition. Thundy does not assert that there is any historical evidence that the Christian birth stories of Jesus were derived from the Buddhist traditions, but suggests that "maybe it is time that Christian scholars looked in the Buddhist tradition for the sources of the idea".

Eddy and Gregorio A. Boyd state that there is no evidence of a historical influence by outside sources on the authors of the New Testament, and some scholars argue that any such historical influence on Christianity is implausible, because first century monotheistic Galilean Jews would not have been open to what they would have seen as pagan stories.

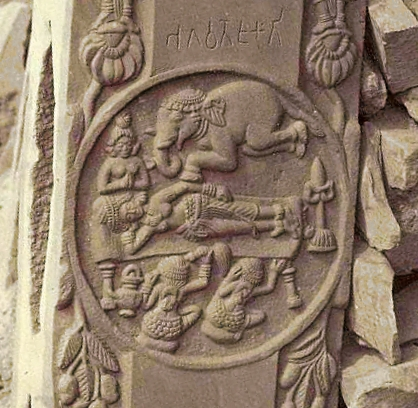
Buddha's birth (Bharhut) Brahmi.
Text: bhagavato rukdanta

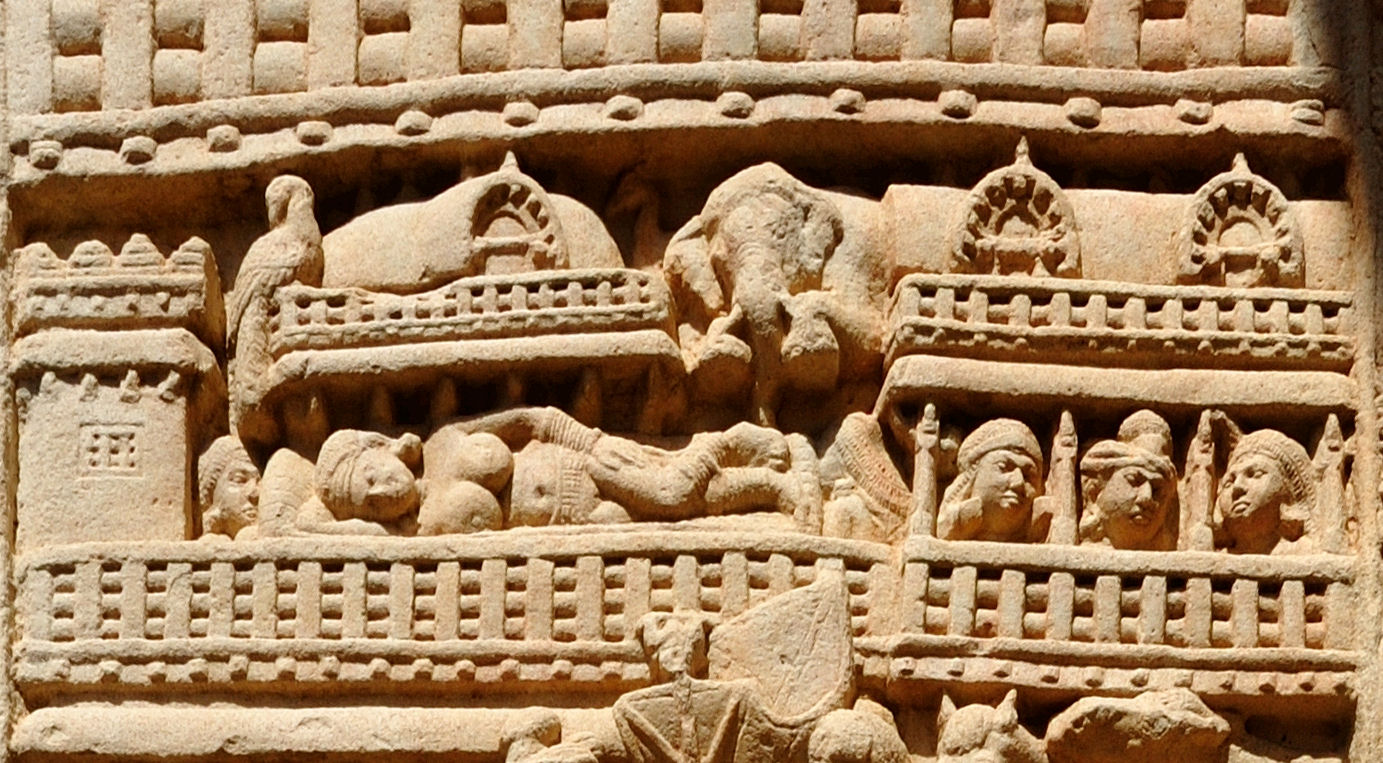
Maya's dream of an elephant when conceiving the Buddha, in Kapilavastu. Sanchi

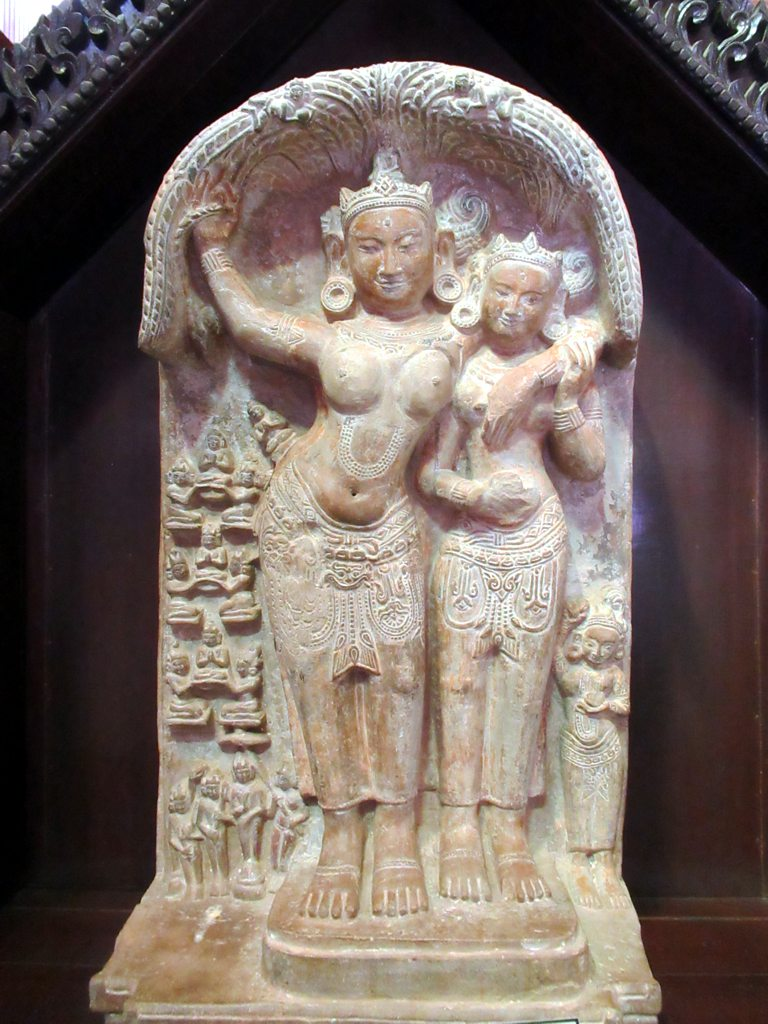
A 12th century representation Mahamaya beside her sister and the birth of Buddha in the Bagan Archaeological Museum at Bagan, Myanmar (Burma).

== See also ==
- The birth of Buddha (Lalitavistara)
- Family of Gautama Buddha
- History of Buddhism
- Maya Devi Temple, Lumbini
