= Mahāprajāpatī Gautamī =

Foster mother of Gautama Buddha and the first Buddhist nun

Prajapati Gotami
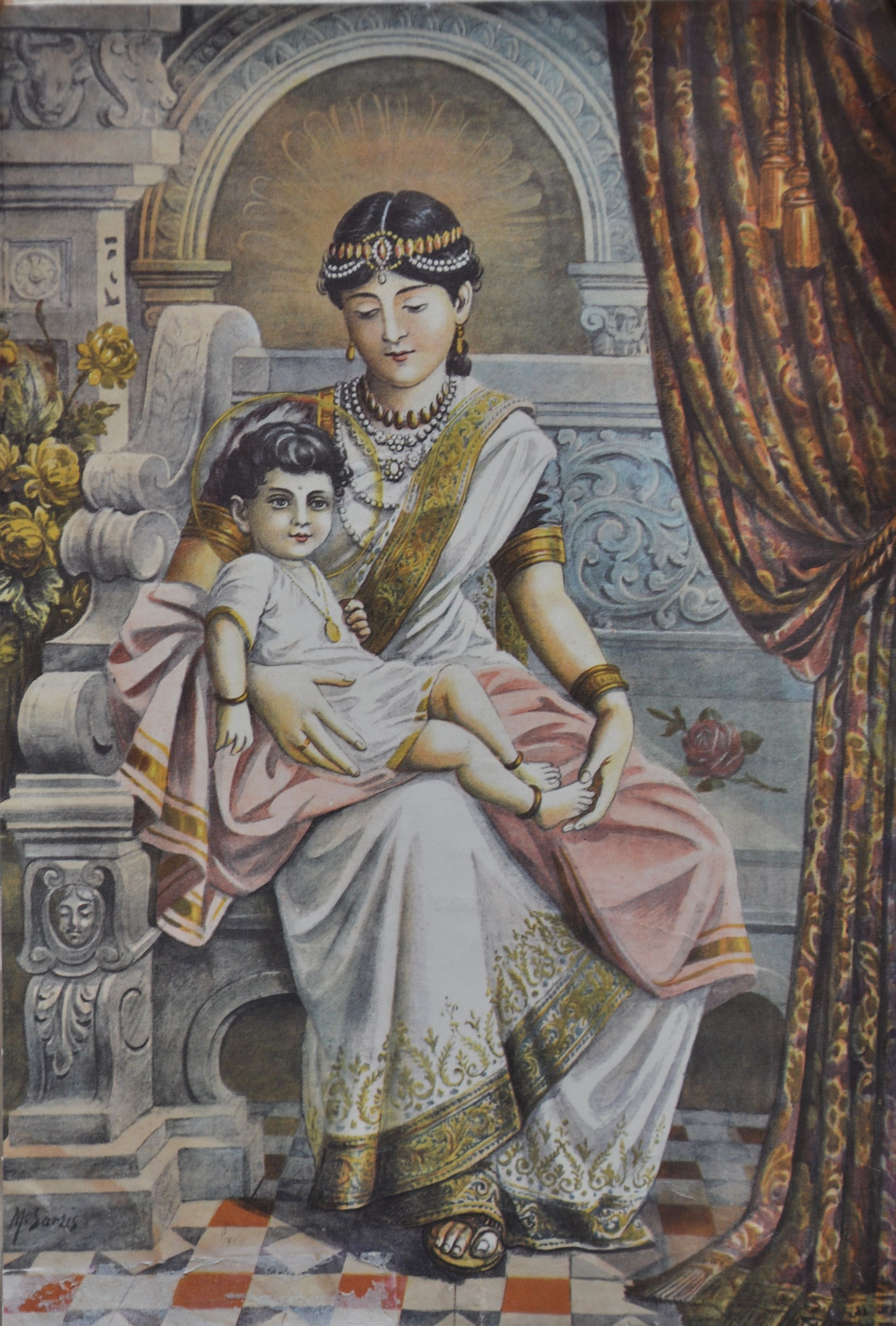
- Prince Siddhartha with Mahāprajāpatī Gotami

Personal life
- Born: Prajāpatī Devadaha
- Spouse: King Śuddhodana
- Children: Sundari Nanda (daughter) Nanda (son) Siddhartha (foster son)
- Parents: Añjana (father); Sulakkhanā (mother)
- Occupation: Bhikṣuṇī
- Relatives: Suppabuddha (brother); Yashodhara (daughter in law); Maya Devi (sister)

Religious life
- Religion: Buddhism
- Dharma name: Prajāpatī

Senior posting
- Teacher: Gautama Buddha

Mahāprajāpatī Gautamī (Sanskrit: महाप्रजापती गौतमी; Pali: Mahāpajāpatī Gotamī) or simply Prajāpatī was the foster-mother, step-mother and maternal aunt (mother's sister) of the Buddha. Therefore, based on the Therī-apadāna (Mahāpajāpatigotamī-therīapadāna, Thi Ap 17), Gotamī is referred to by the title "Mother of the Buddha" (Pali: Buddhamātā). In Buddhist tradition, she was the first woman to seek ordination for women, which she did from Siddhartha Gautama directly, and she became the first bhikṣuṇī (Buddhist nun).

== Depiction ==
Gotamī's story was widely distributed, with multiple versions existing. It is recorded in the various surviving Vinaya traditions, including the Pali Canon and Sarvastivada and Mulasarvastivada versions.

=== Theravada Buddhism ===
In the Pali Canon, her request for ordination is detailed in the Anguttara Nikaya. The stories of her past lives are included in the Therīgāthā, Theri-apadāna and Jataka.

=== Mahayana Buddhism ===
In the Lotus Sutra, the Buddha bestows a prophecy upon Mahāprajāpatī that in the distant alternate timeline on future, she will become a buddha named Sarvasattvapriyadarśana.

=== Gallery ===
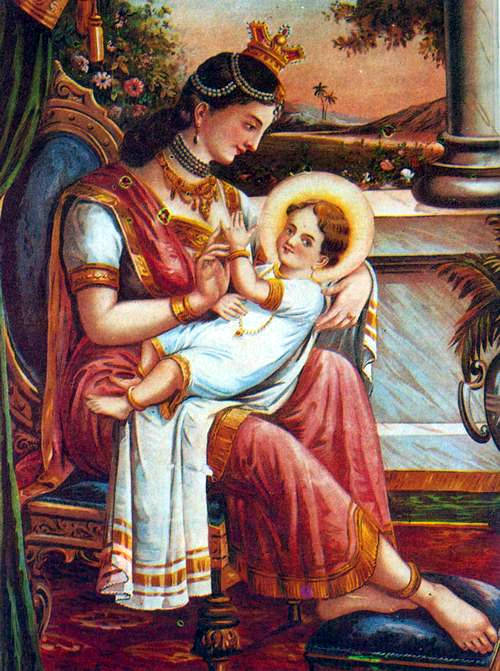
Painting of Prince Siddhartha with Mahapajapati Gotami

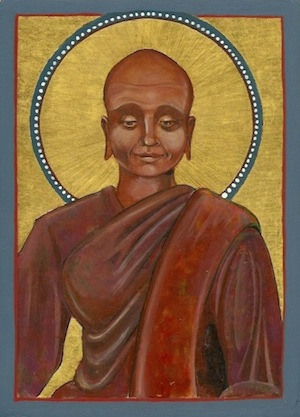
Painting of Pajāpatī Gotamī

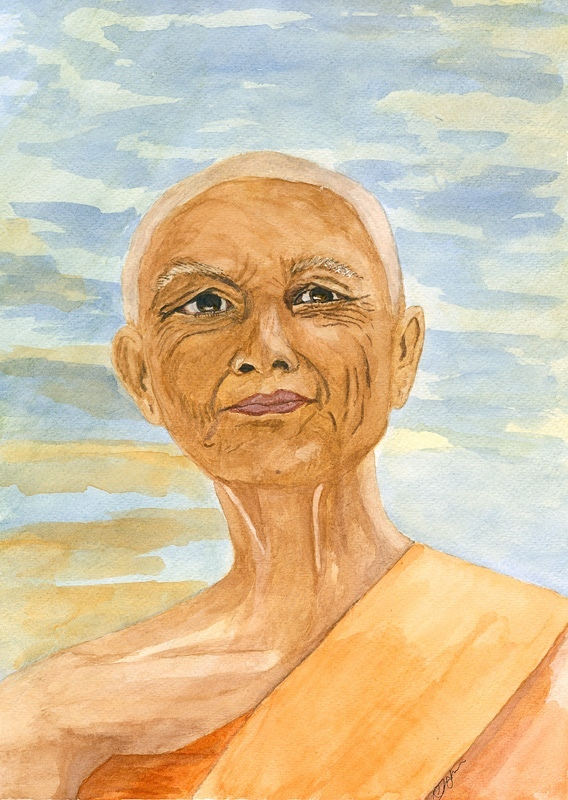
Painting of Pajāpatī Gotamī by Sati Saraniya Hermitage

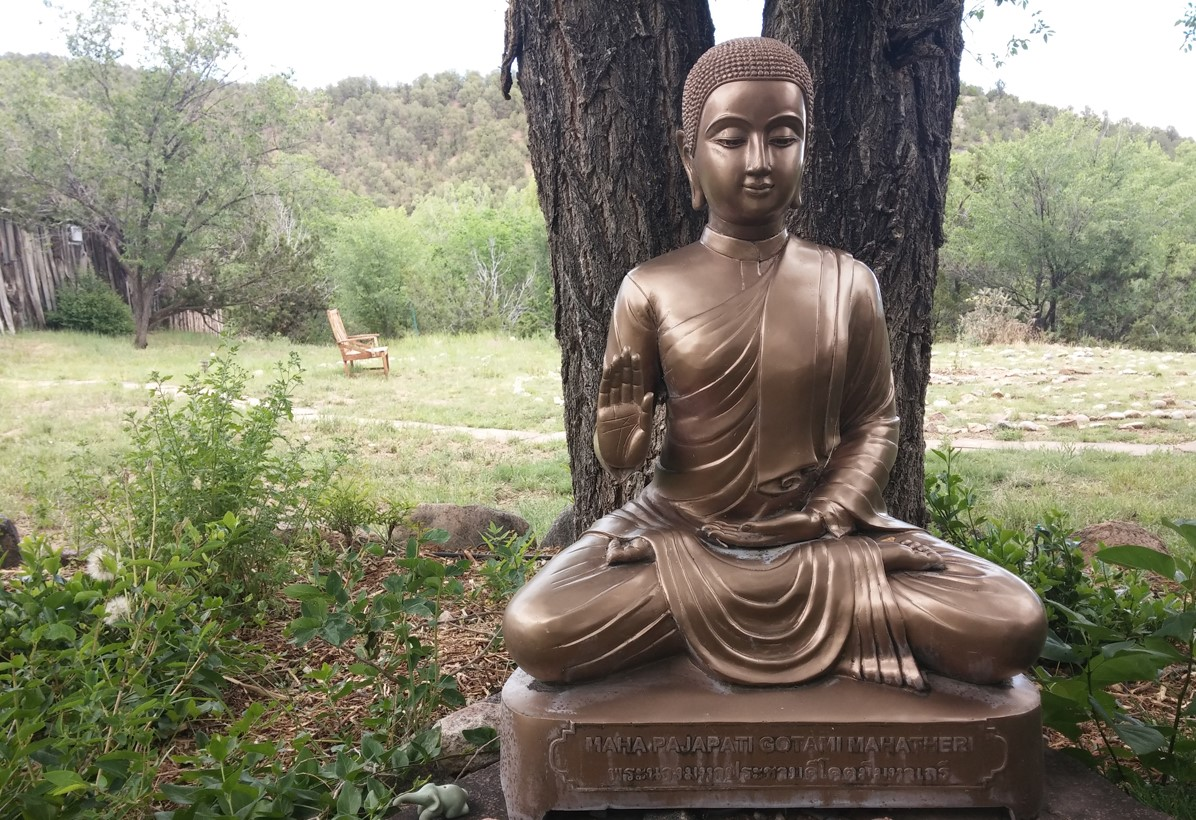
Pajāpatī Gotamī statue at Upaya Zen Center in Santa Fe, New Mexico, US

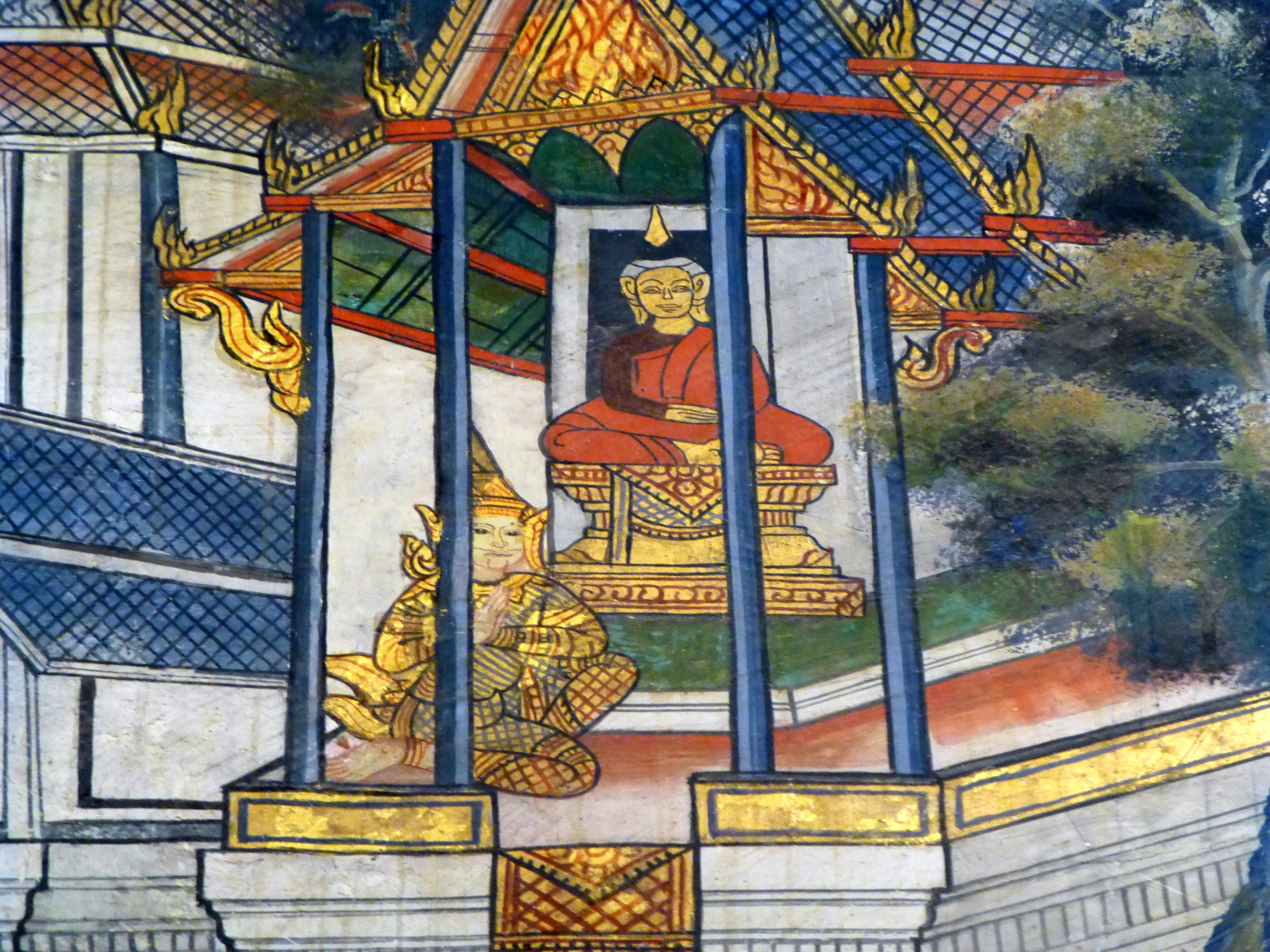
Painting depicting Mahāpajāpatī from Wat Kasattrathirat, Ayutthaya, Thailand

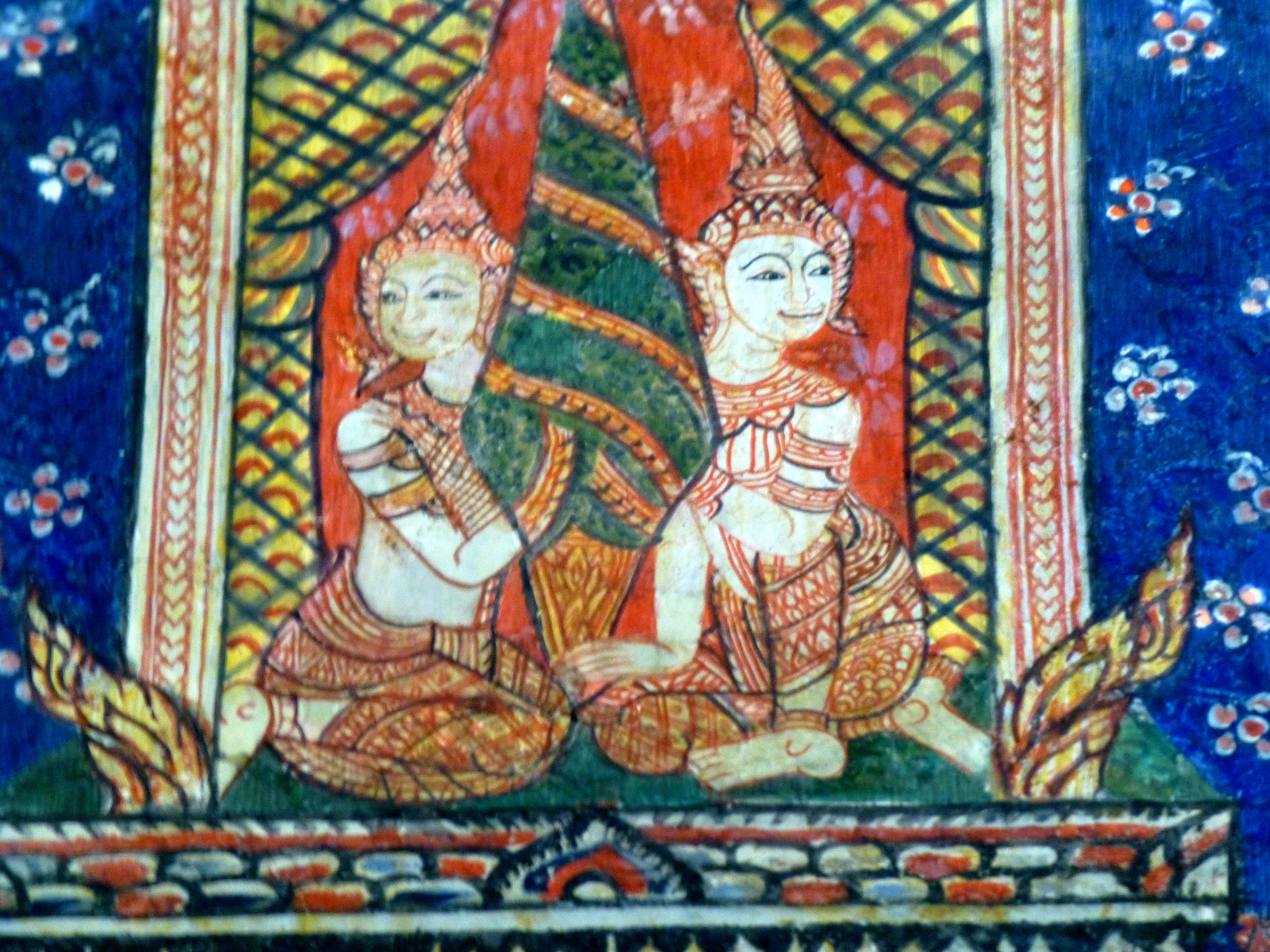
Painting depicting the marriage of Suddhodana with Mahāpajāpatī from Wat Kasattrathirat, Ayutthaya

== Past lives ==
According to the Theri-apadāna, Gotamī started on the path of the Dhamma in a past life, during the time of Padumuttara Buddha, when she was born to a wealthy family in Hamsavati. She witnessed Padumuttara Buddha place his aunt, a bhikkhuni, in a senior position, and aspired to achieve the same position after providing offerings to the Buddha and his followers for seven days. Padumuttara Buddha said she would achieve her aspiration under Gautama Buddha. She was later reborn in the Tavatimsa heaven as a god.

Gotamī then returned to the human realm as the leader of 500 female slaves. In that life, they encountered a group of 500 paccekabuddhas who had no huts for the duration of the rain retreat. Gotamī asked the 500 female slaves to provide food offerings and convinced their husbands to build huts for the rain retreat. Following the rain retreat, Gotamī had her followers prepare robes for the paccekabuddhas. In another rebirth, Gotamī is said to have given food alms to 500 paccekabuddhas near Varanasi. Gotamī and her followers continued to perform meritorious acts throughout their lives and were reborn as Tavatimsa gods. Gotamī's followers would follow her in each birth and attain liberation as bhikkhunis during the time of Gautama Buddha.

== "Mother of the Buddha" title ==
In the Therī-apadāna (Mahāpajāpatigotamītherīapadāna, Thi Ap 17), a verse is attributed to Gotamī:

| Women can easily obtain the name "King's Mother" or "Chief Queen."; The name, "Mother of the Buddha" is the hardest name to obtain. O Hero, I’ve obtained that name! I got my wish because of you. Whether little things or big things, all of that is fulfilled by me. | Rañño mātā mahesīti, sulabhaṁ nāmamitthinaṁ; Buddhamātāti yaṁ nāmaṁ, etaṁ paramadullabhaṁ. Tañca laddhaṁ mahāvīra, paṇidhānaṁ mamaṁ tayā; Aṇukaṁ vā mahantaṁ vā, taṁ sabbaṁ pūritaṁ mayā. |
— Mahāpajāpatigotamītherīapadāna, Thi Ap 17 tr. Jonathan S. Walters

Through this verse, Gotamī states that although worldly titles such as "King's Mother" or "Chief Queen" are easily obtained by a woman, the title "Mother of the Buddha" (Pali: Buddhamātā) is an achievement that is exceptionally difficult to obtain. She expresses her gratitude that through the Buddha (whom she addresses as "Hero"), her highest aspiration has been fulfilled and all her goals have been accomplished.

== Final life ==
Tradition says Maya and Mahāpajāpatī Gotamī were Koliyan princesses and sisters of Suppabuddha. Mahāpajāpatī was both the Buddha's maternal aunt and adoptive mother, raising him after her sister Maya, the Buddha's birth mother, died. She raised Siddhartha as if he were her own child.

An eminent Therī, Mahāpajāpatī was born at Devdaha as the younger sister of Māyā. Mahāpajāpatī was so called because, at her birth, augurs prophesied that she would have a large following. Both sisters married King Suddhodhana, leader of the Śākya. When Māyā died seven days after the birth of the Bodhisatta (the "Buddha-to-be"), Pajāpati looked after the Bodhisatta and nursed him. She raised the Buddha and had her own children, Siddhartha's half-sister Sundari Nanda and half-brother Nanda.

=== Ordination of the first woman ===
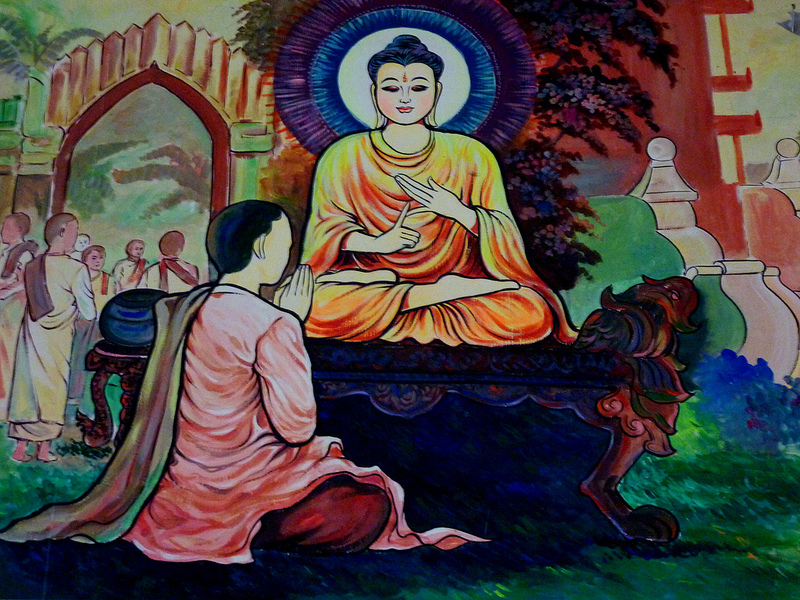
Mahapajapati, first Buddhist nun and Buddha's stepmother ordains

When King Suddhodhana died, Mahāpajāpatī Gotamī decided to attain ordination. Gotamī went to the Buddha and asked to be ordained into the Sangha three times. The Buddha refused and went on to Vesāli. Undaunted, Gotamī cut off her hair and donned yellow robes and with 500 princesses, 250 from the Sakyan kingdom and 250 from the Koliyan kingdom followed the Buddha to Vesāli on foot. Upon arrival, Gotamī stood crying at the entrance of the Buddha's residence. Ananda, one of the principal disciples and an attendant of the Buddha, met her and offered to intercede with the Buddha on her behalf. Ananda was refused the first two times and asked the following in this third attempt:

Respectfully he questioned the Buddha, "Lord, are women capable of realising the various stages of sainthood as nuns?"

"They are, Ananda," said the Buddha.

"If that is so, Lord, then it would be good if women could be ordained as nuns," said Ananda, encouraged by the Buddha's reply.

"If, Ananda, Maha Pajapati Gotami would accept the Eight Conditions it would be regarded that she has been ordained already as a nun."

Gotamī agreed to accept the Eight Garudhammas and was accorded the status of the first bhikkhuni. Subsequent women had to undergo full ordination to become nuns.

Gotamī died at the age of 120.

== Bibliography ==
- Anālayo, Bhikkhu (2011). "Mahapajapati's going forth in the Madhyama agama" (PDF). Journal of Buddhist Ethics. 18: 268–317. ISSN 1076-9005.
- Anālayo, Bhikkhu (2016). "The Going Forth of Mahāpajāpatī Gotamī in T 60" (PDF). Journal of Buddhist Ethics. 23: 1–31. ISSN 1076-9005.
- Garling, Wendy (2016). Stars at Dawn: Forgotten Stories of Women in the Buddha's Life. Shambhala Publications. ISBN 978-1-61180-265-8.
- Garling, Wendy (2021). The Woman Who Raised the Buddha: The Extraordinary Life of Mahaprajapati. Shambhala Publications. ISBN 978-1611806694.
- Scott, Rachel M. (2010). "Buddhism, miraculous powers, and gender - rethinking the stories of Theravada nuns". Journal of the International Association of Buddhist Studies. 33 (1–2): 489–511.
- Tsomo, Karma Lekshe (2004). "Mahāprajāpatī Gautamī". In Buswell, Robert E. (ed.). Encyclopedia of Buddhism. Macmillan Reference USA. pp. 489–490. ISBN 0-02-865718-7.
- Walters, Jonathan S. (1994). "A Voice from the Silence: The Buddha's Mother's Story". History of Religions. 33 (4): 350–379. doi:10.1086/463377. JSTOR 1062715.
- Amatayakul, Supakwadee; Satha-Anand, Suwanna (2023). "Mahapajapati Gotami महाप्रजापती गौतमी Circa Sixth–Seventh Centuries BCE". In Waithe, Mary Ellen; Boos Dykeman, Therese (eds.). Women Philosophers from Non-western Traditions: The First Four Thousand Years. Cham: Springer International Publishing. pp. 89–101. doi:10.1007/978-3-031-28563-9. ISBN 978-3-031-28563-9.
