= Devadatta =

Buddhist monk, cousin and brother-in-law of Gautama Siddhārtha

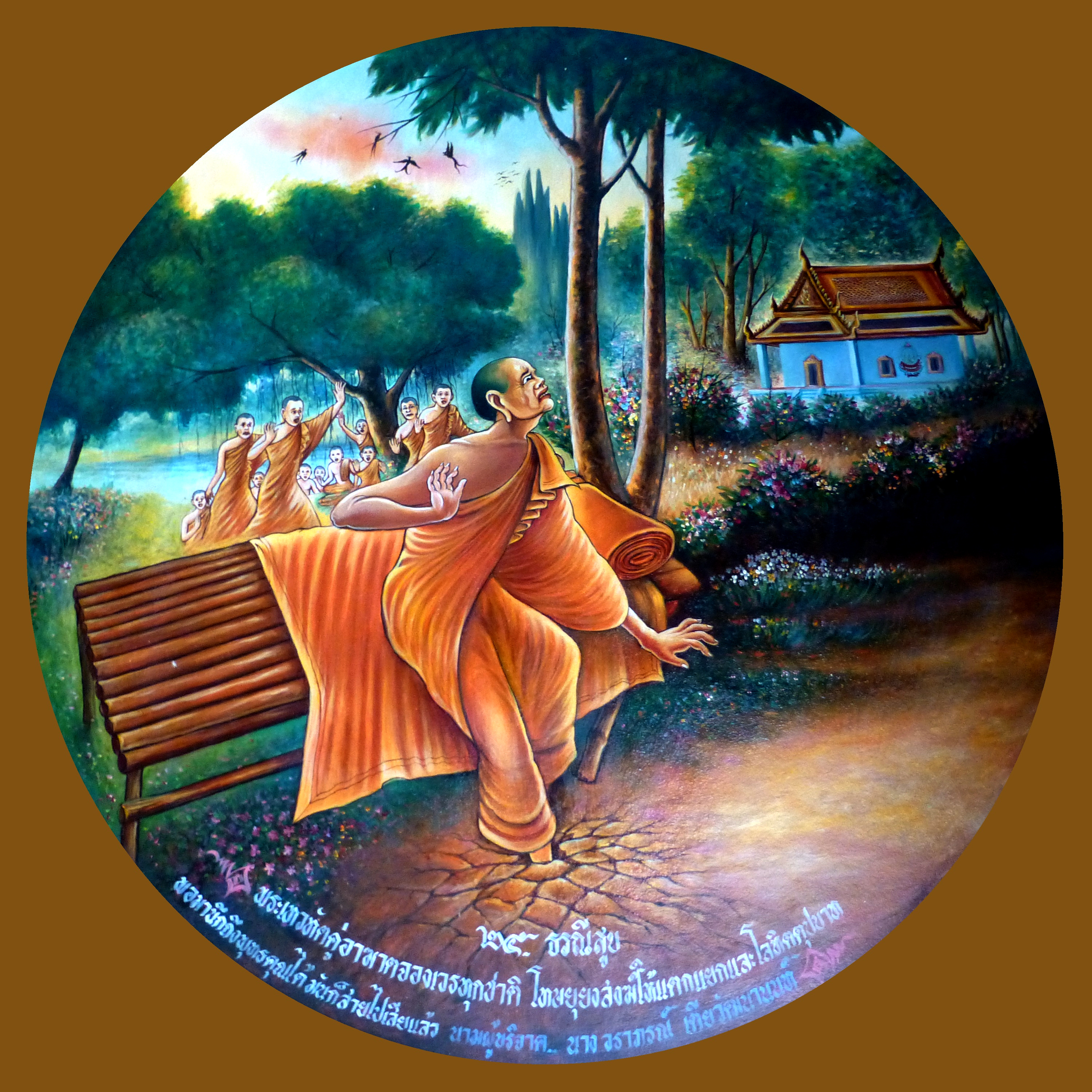
- Death of Devadatta, sinking into the Earth

Religious life
- Religion: Buddhism

Translations of Devadatta
- Sanskrit: देवदत्त (Devadatta)
- Pali: देवदत्त (Devadatta)
- Bengali: দেবদত্ত (Debdotto)
- Burmese: ဒေဝဒတ် (Dewadat)
- Chinese: 提婆達多 (Tipodaduo)
- Japanese: 提婆達多 (Daibadatta)
- Khmer: ទេវទត្ត (Tevatort)
- Korean: 데바닷타 (RR: (Debadatta))
- Lao: ເທວະທັດ (Thevathat)
- Sinhala: දේවදත්ත දෙව්දත්
- Thai: เทวทัต (Thewathat)
- Vietnamese: Đề-bà-đạt-đa

Devadatta was, by tradition, a Buddhist monk, cousin and brother-in-law of Gautama Siddhārtha. The accounts of his life vary greatly, but he is generally seen as an evil and divisive figure in Buddhism, who led a breakaway group in the earliest days of the religion.

== Etymology ==
The name Devadatta means god-given in Palī and Sanskrit. It is composed from the stem form of deva ("god") and the past participle datta of the verb da ("to give"), composed as a tatpuruṣa compound. In the Bhagavad Gītā, the conch shell used by Arjuna on the battle-field of Kurukshetra was named Devadatta. The name Devadatta is still used today.

== Scholarship ==
=== Mahāsāṃghika Vinaya research ===
According to Andrew Skilton, modern scholarship generally agrees that the Mahāsāṃghika Vinaya is the oldest extant Buddhist Vinaya.

According to Reginald Ray, the Mahāsāṃghika Vinaya mentions the figure of Devadatta, but in a way that is different from the vinayas of the Sthaviravāda branch. According to this study, the earliest Vinaya material common to all sects simply depicts Devadatta as a Buddhist saint who wishes for the monks to live a rigorous lifestyle. This has led Ray to regard the story of Devadatta as a legend produced by the Sthavira group.

However, as Bhikkhu Sujato has noted, the Mahāsāṃghika Vinaya does indeed contain material depicting Devadatta as a schismatic figure trying to split the sangha (monastic community). Sujato adds: "The only relevant difference is the grounds he is said to base his attempt on. Whereas the Sthavira Vinayas say he promulgated a set of 'five points', by which he tried to enforce an excessively ascetic lifestyle on the monks, the Mahāsaṅghika Vinaya omits the five points and attributes a much more comprehensive agenda to him." Sujato further argues that "The fact that the Devadatta legend, at least the core episodes 13 and 14, is common to all six Vinayas including the Mahāsaṅghika suggests the legend arose among the presectarian community, and in all likelihood harks back to the time of the Buddha himself."

=== Records from Chinese pilgrims to India ===
Faxian and other Chinese pilgrims who travelled to India in the early centuries of the current era recorded the continued existence of "Gotamaka" buddhists, followers of Devadatta. Gotamaka are also referred to in Pali texts of the second and fifth centuries of the current era. The followers of Devadatta are recorded to have honored all the Buddhas previous to Śākyamuni (Gautama Buddha), but not Śākyamuni himself. According to Faxian, Xuanzang and Yijing's writings, some people practised in a similar way and with the same books as common Buddhists, but followed the similar tapas and performed rituals to the past three buddhas and not Śākyamuni.

== Theravāda portrayals of Devadatta ==
=== In the Theravāda Vinaya ===
Cullavagga section VII of the Vinayapiṭaka of the Theravādins, which deals with schisms, recalls an account of how Devadatta went forth along with a number of the Buddha's other relatives and clansmen. In the first year he attained psychic power (abhijñā), but made no supramundane achievement.

Seeking honor and status, Devadatta approached Prince Ajātashatru, the heir to the throne of Magadha. Having psychic power, he assumed the form of a young boy clad in snakes and sat in the prince's lap; this much impressed Ajātashatru, who became his disciple.

Ajātashatru began to send great offerings to Devadatta, and the latter became obsessed with his own worth. He began to believe that he should lead the Sangha instead of the Buddha; his attempts to usurp the Buddha decreased his psychic power, but Devadatta continued.

When told about the offerings that Devadatta was receiving, the Buddha remarked that all these gains were only going towards his destruction, just as a plantain or a bamboo is destroyed by its fruit.

Shortly thereafter, Devadatta asked the Buddha to retire and let him take over the running of the Sangha. The Buddha retorted that he did not even let his trusted disciples Śāriputra or Maudgalyayana run the Sangha, let alone someone like Devadatta. The Buddha declared that Devadatta should be cast out like spit, and the Buddha warned the Sangha that Devadatta had changed for the worse.

Seeing the danger in this, Devadatta approached Prince Ajātashatru and encouraged him to kill his father King Bimbisāra, while Devadatta killed the Buddha. The king found out about his plan and handed over control of the kingdom to his son and heir.

Ajātashatru then gave mercenaries to Devadatta, who ordered them to kill the Buddha; in an elaborate plan to cover his tracks, he ordered other men to kill the killers, and more to kill them and so on. When the mercenaries approached the Buddha, they were unable to carry out their orders, and were rallied to his side instead.

Devadatta then tried to kill the Buddha himself by throwing a rock at him from a great height while the Buddha walked on the slopes of a mountain. This failed, and as a consequence he decided to have the elephant Nāḷāgiri intoxicated and let him loose on the Buddha while he was on alms-round. However, the power of the Buddha's love and kindness overcame the elephant, and he did not harm the Buddha.

Devadatta then decided to foment schism in the Buddhist community. He gathered some allies among the monks, and demanded that the Buddha accede to the following rules for the monks: they should dwell all their lives in the forest, live entirely on alms obtained by begging, wear only robes made of discarded rags, dwell at the foot of a tree, and abstain completely from fish and flesh.

The Buddha refused to make any of these compulsory. Devadatta declared that the Buddha was living in abundance in luxury, and caused a schism by reading out the initiation rites and codes (pāṭimokkha) to five hundred initiates, away from the Buddha and his followers.

The Buddha sent his two most trusted disciples, Śāriputra or Maudgalyayana, to bring back the errant young monks. Devadatta thought they had come to join his Sangha, and invited Śāriputra to a discussion; the former then fell asleep. The Buddha's disciples then persuaded the young monks to return to the Buddha.

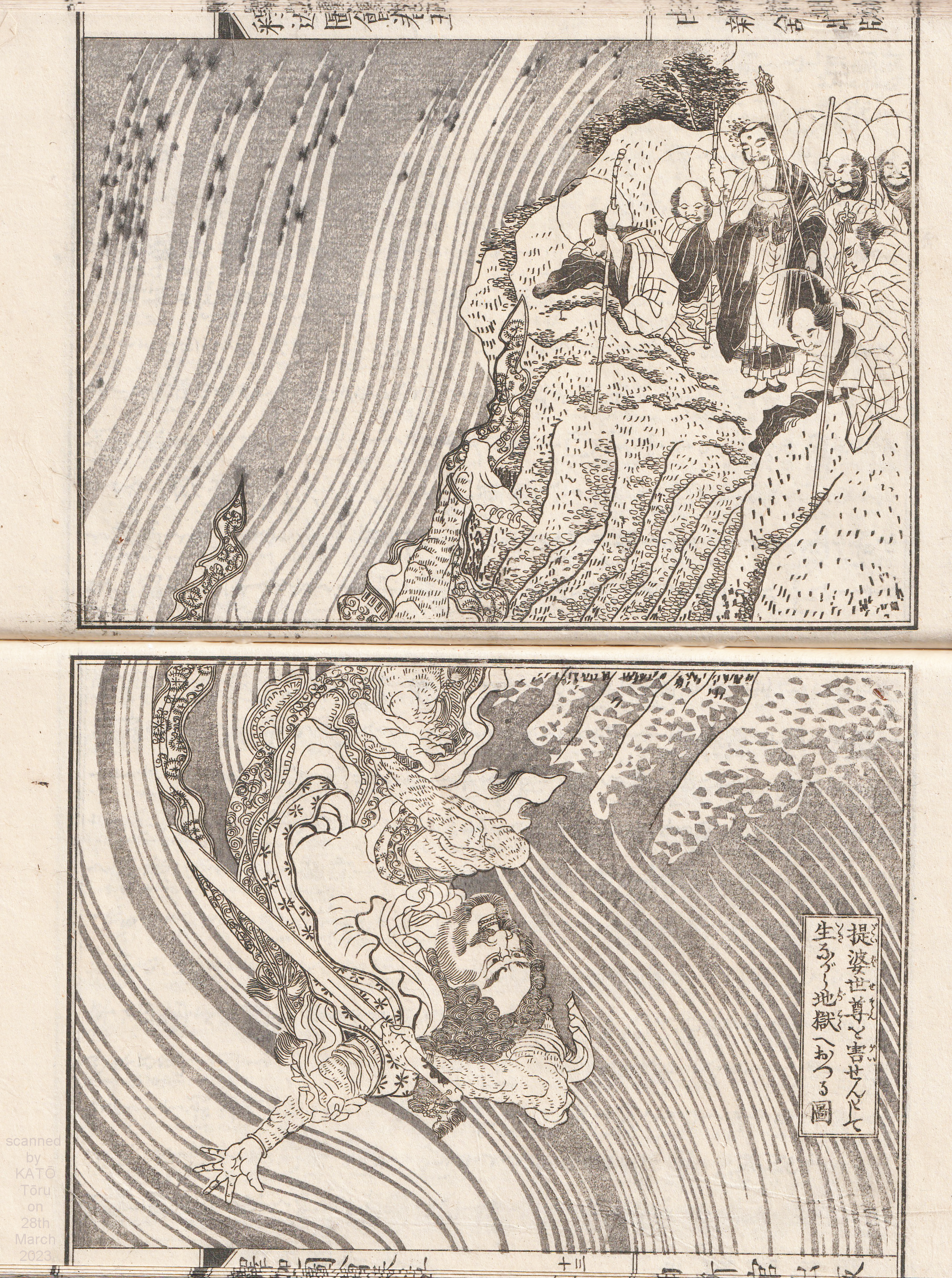
Devadatta sucked into hell. Illustration by Hokusai

The Buddha did not show any hatred for Devadatta, even after what had happened. Soon after, Devadatta got sick and realized that what he had done was wrong. He tried to visit the Buddha and apologize for what he did, but it was too late; on the way to the Buddha, the earth sucked Devadatta into Naraka (translated as purgatory or Hell) for his evil deeds. Beings are sent to Naraka as an inherent consequence of bad karma, and they stay there until bad karma is compensated for.

=== Pali Canon ===
According to the Pāli Canon, he taught his sangha to adopt five tapas (literally, austerities) throughout their lives:

1. that monks should dwell all their lives in the forest,
2. that they should accept no invitations to meals, but live entirely on alms obtained by begging,
3. that they should wear only robes made of discarded rags and accept no robes from the laity,
4. that they should dwell at the foot of a tree and not under a roof,
5. that they should abstain completely from fish and flesh.

The Buddha's reply was that those who felt so inclined could follow these rules – except that of sleeping under a tree during the rainy season – but he refused to make the rules obligatory. They are among the 13 ascetic practices (dhutanga).

His followers (including bhikkhus and bhikkhunis) were new monks from the Vajjī clan.

King Kalābu was one of Devadatta's past lives.

=== Milinda Panha ===
In the Milinda Panha, a series of previous lives of Gautama Buddha and Devadatta are told by Nagasena to King Menander I. When asked by Menander why Devadatta sometimes prevails in their successive incarnations, Nagasena explains Devadatta is not always evil, and in fact has accrued much merit in some of his lives. Even after being ordained, he lives with virtue for a long time until developing an ambition to overcome the Buddha.

== Mahāyāna portrayals of Devadatta ==
=== Lotus Sūtra ===
In the Lotus Sūtra, chapter 12, found in the Mahāyāna Buddhist tradition, the Buddha teaches that in a past life, Devadatta was his holy teacher who set him on the path, and makes a noteworthy statement about how even Devadatta will in time become a Buddha:

The Buddha said to his monks: "The king at that time was I myself, and this seer was the man who is now Devadatta. All because Devadatta was a good friend to me, I was able to become fully endowed with this six paramitas, pity, compassion, joy, and indifference, with the thirty-two features, the eighty characteristics, the purple-tinged golden color, the ten powers, the four kinds of fearlessness, the four methods of winning people, the eighteen unshared properties, and the transcendental powers and the power of the way. The fact that I have attained impartial and correct enlightenment and can save living beings on a broad scale is all due to Devadatta who was a good friend."

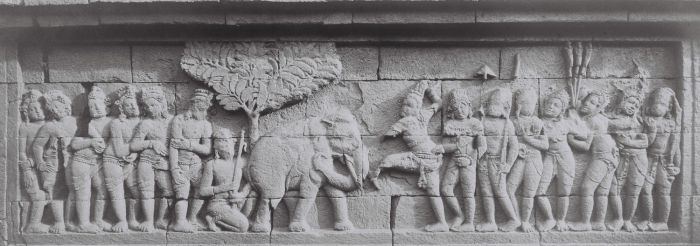
Devadatta kills the elephant.

The Lotus Sutra may be interpreted as relaying the idea that Devadatta is not saved by the Buddha himself, but by his own merit, leading to his awakening.

According to Jacqueline Stone and Stephen F. Teiser, Devadatta was "well known to the sutra's early devotees as the Buddhist archetype of an evildoer." In the context of the "promise of buddhahood for everyone, this chapter became widely understood as illustrating the potential for enlightenment even in evil persons."

=== Amitāyurdhyāna Sūtra ===
In the Mahayana Buddhist text, the Amitāyurdhyāna Sūtra, Devadatta is said to have convinced Prince Ajātasattu to murder his father King Bimbisāra and ascend the throne. Ajātasattu follows the advice, and this action (another anantarika-kamma for killing one's own father) prevents him from attaining stream-entry at a later time, when listening to some teaching of the Buddha. This is confirmed by the Samaññaphala Sutta of the Dīgha Nikāya (DN 2).

=== Others ===
In the Mahāmeghasūtra Devadatta is called a mahāpuruṣa (great being).

In Faxian's account, after meeting failure his attempts to murder Gautama Buddha through arrows, a rock and an elephant, Devadatta pretends to prostrate to his feet and claws at him with poisoned fingernails, but the Buddha turns his legs into rock crystal, causing Devadatta to break his nails and get poisoned himself. Gautama offers Devadatta forgiveness in exchange for Devadatta's faith, warning that whoever professes his faith falsely will go to hell. Being in great pain, Devadatta does this and is immediately swallowed by hell.

== See also ==
- List of Sri Lankan monarchs
- History of Sri Lanka

== Bibliography ==
- Buswell, Robert Jr; Lopez, Donald S. Jr., eds. (2013). Princeton Dictionary of Buddhism. Princeton, NJ: Princeton University Press. pp. 233–234. ISBN 9780691157863.
- Deeg, Max (1999). The Saṅgha of Devadatta: Fiction and History of a Heresy in the Buddhist Tradition, Journal of the International College for Advanced Buddhist Studies 2, 195- 230
- Jataka i. 142
- Mahaavastu, iii. 76
- Matsunami, Yoshihiro (1979), Conflict within the Development of Buddhism, Japanese Journal of Religious Studies 6 (1/2), 329–345
- Mukherjee, Biswadeb (1966). Die Überlieferung von Devadatta, dem Widersacher des Buddha, in den kanonischen Schriften, München: Kitzinger
- Tezuka, Osamu (2006), Devadatta, London: HarperCollins
