= The Buddha =

Founder of Buddhism

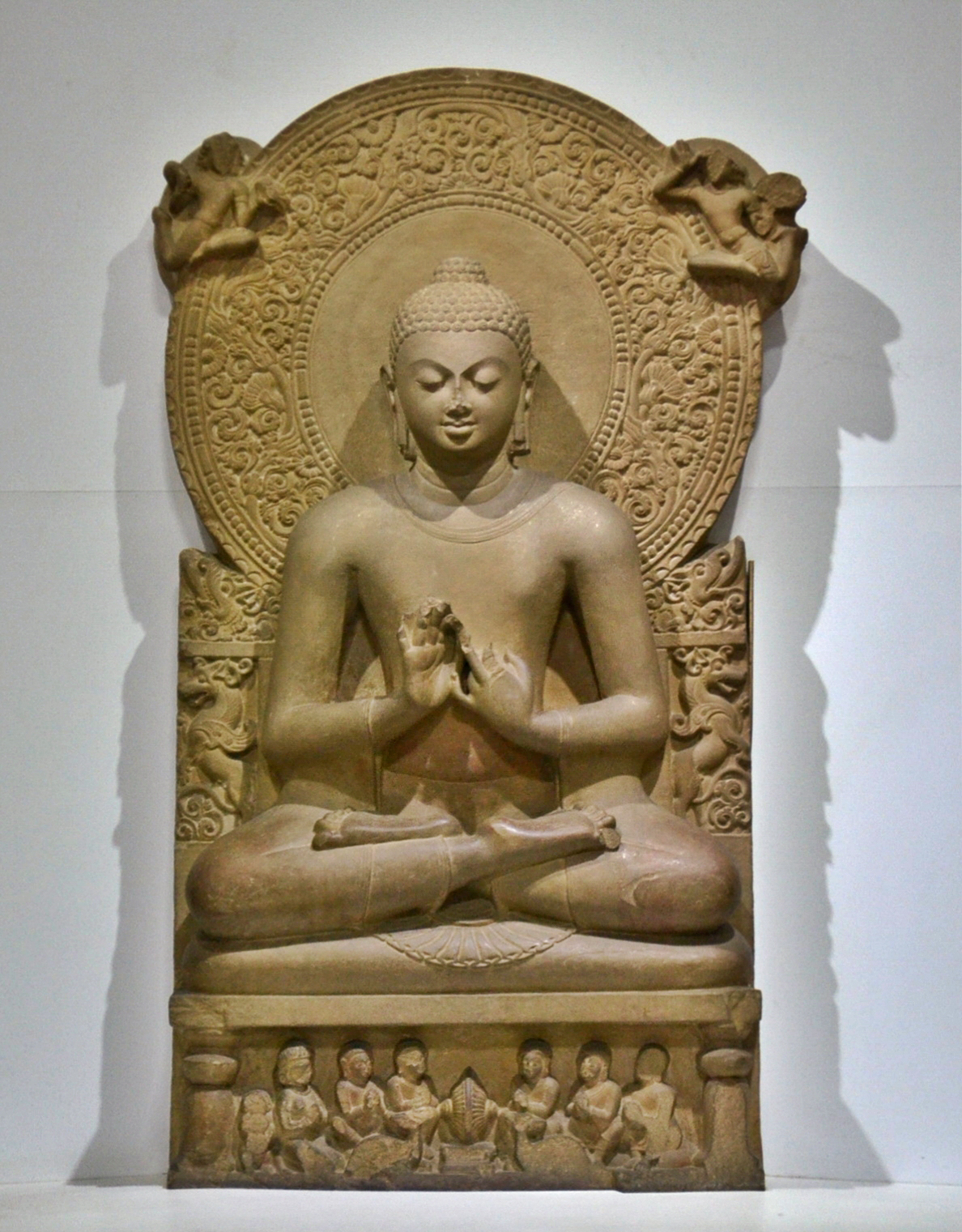
- Sculpture of the Buddha preaching his first sermon from Sarnath, 5th century CE (Note: Buddha is seated cross-legged in the lotus position. In the centre of the base relief is a wheel symbolizing the dharmachakra, the Wheel of Buddhist law, with couchant deer on either side symbolizing the deer park in which the sermon was preached. The fingers of his hands form the teaching pose.: Sahni (1914, pp. 70–71, chapter B (b) 181): "Image (ht 5′ 3″ up to the top of the halo; width at base 2′ 7″) of Gautama Buddha seated cross-legged, preaching the first sermon at Sarnath, on a thick cushion supported on a seat with moulded legs."; Eck (1982, p. 63): "In the most famous of these images in the Sarnath museum, the Buddha sits cross-legged, his limbs in the perfect proportions prescribed by the iconometry of the day, his hands in a teaching pose, his eyes downcast, half-shut in meditation, his head backed by a beautifully ornamented circular nimbus."; Mani (2012, pp. 66–67): "The seated Buddha, B(b) 181 showing Buddha cross-legged in the attitude of preaching, is one of the most exquisite creations of Gupta art. The halo is carved with a pair of celestial figures and conventionalized floral scroll-work.")

Personal life
- Born: Siddhartha Gautama c. 563 or 480 BCE Lumbini, Shakya Republic (according to Buddhist tradition) (Note: According to the Buddhist tradition, following the Nidanakatha (Fausböll, Davids & Davids 1878, p.), the introductory to the Jataka tales, the stories of the former lives of the Buddha, Gautama was born in Lumbini, now in modern Nepal, but then part of the territory of the Shakya-clan. In the mid-3rd century BCE the Emperor Ashoka determined that Lumbini was Gautama's birthplace and thus installed a pillar there with the inscription: "...this is where the Buddha, sage of the Śākyas (Śākyamuni), was born." (Gethin 1998, p. 19) Based on stone inscriptions, there is also speculation that Lumbei, Kapileswar village, Odisha, at the east coast of India, was the site of ancient Lumbini. (Mahāpātra 1977; Mohāpātra 2000, p. 114; Tripathy 2014) Hartmann discusses the hypothesis and states, "The inscription has generally been considered spurious (...)" (Hartmann 1991, pp. 38–39) He quotes Sircar: "There can hardly be any doubt that the people responsible for the Kapilesvara inscription copied it from the said facsimile not much earlier than 1928." Some sources mention Kapilavastu as the birthplace of the Buddha. Gethin states: "The earliest Buddhist sources state that the future Buddha was born Siddhārtha Gautama (Pali Siddhattha Gotama), the son of a local chieftain—a rājan—in Kapilavastu (Pali Kapilavatthu) what is now Nepal." (Gethin 1998, p. 14) Gethin does not give references for this statement. Various sources say Kapilavastu was the place where he grew up: (Keown & Prebish 2013, p. 436): Warder (2000, p. 45): "The Buddha [...] was born in the Sakya Republic, which was the city state of Kapilavastu, a very small state just inside the modern state boundary of Nepal against the Northern Indian frontier.; Walshe (1995, p. 20): "He belonged to the Sakya clan dwelling on the edge of the Himalayas, his actual birthplace being a few kilometres north of the present-day Northern Indian border, in Nepal. His father was, in fact, an elected chief of the clan rather than the king he was later made out to be, though his title was raja—a term which only partly corresponds to our word 'king'. Some of the states of North India at that time were kingdoms and others republics, and the Sakyan republic was subject to the powerful king of neighbouring Kosala, which lay to the south".; The exact location of ancient Kapilavastu is unknown.(Keown & Prebish 2013, p. 436) It may have been either Piprahwa in Uttar Pradesh, northern India (Nakamura 1980, p. 18; Srivastava 1979, pp. 61–74; Srivastava 1980, p. 108), or Tilaurakot (Tuladhar 2002, pp. 1–7), present-day Nepal (Huntington 1986, Keown & Prebish 2013, p. 436). The two cities are located only 24 kilometres (15 miles) from each other (Huntington 1986).; See also § Birth and early life and § Sources)
- Died: c. 483 or 400 BCE (aged 80) (Note: 411–400: Dundas (2002), p. 24: "...as is now almost universally accepted by informed Indological scholarship, a re-examination of early Buddhist historical material, [...], necessitates a redating of the Buddha's death to between 411 and 400 BCE..."; 405: Richard Gombrich; Around 400: See the consensus in the essays by leading scholars in Narain (2003).; According to Pali scholar K. R. Norman, a life span for the Buddha of c. 480 to 400 BCE (and his teaching period roughly from c. 445 to 400 BCE) "fits the archaeological evidence better". See also Notes on the Dates of the Buddha Íåkyamuni.; Indologist Michael Witzel provides a "revised" dating of 460–380 BCE for the lifetime of the Buddha.) Kushinagar, Malla Republic (according to Buddhist tradition) (Note: According to Mahaparinibbana Sutta (see Access to insight, Maha-parinibbana Sutta), Gautama died in Kushinagar, which is located in present-day Uttar Pradesh, India.)
- Resting place: Cremated; ashes divided among followers
- Spouse: Yaśodharā
- Children: Rāhula
- Parents: Śuddhodana (father); Maya (mother)
- Known for: Establishing Buddhism
- Other names: Gautama Buddha; Śhākyamuni (lit. 'Sage of the Shakyas')

Religious life
- Religion: Buddhism

Senior posting
- Predecessor: Kāśyapa Buddha
- Successor: Maitreya

Sanskrit name
- Sanskrit: Siddhārtha Gautama (सिद्धार्थ गौतम)

Pali name
- Pali: Siddhattha Gotama

Siddhartha Gautama, (Note: /sɪˈdɑːrtə, -θə ˈɡɔːtəmə, ˈɡaʊ- ˈbuːdə, ˈbʊdə/, Sanskrit: [siddʱaːrtʰɐ gautɐmɐ]) most commonly referred to as the Buddha (lit. 'the awakened one'), (Note: The translation of "bodhi" and "Buddha" has shifted over time. While translated as "enlightenment" and "the enlightened one" since the 19th century, following Max Muller (Cohen 2006, p. 9), the preferred translation has shifted to "awakening" and "awakened one" (Bodhi 2020; Abrahams 2021: Gimello (2003, p. entry "Bodhi (awakening"): "The Sanskrit and Pāli word bodhi derives from the Indic root [.radical] budh (to awaken, to know) [...] Those who are attentive to the more literal meaning of the Indic original tend to translate bodhi into English as 'awakening', and this is to be recommended. However, it has long been conventional to translate it as 'enlightenment', despite the risks of multiple misrepresentation attendant upon the use of so heavily freighted an English word."; Norman (1997, p. 29): "From the fourth jhana he gained bodhi. It is not at all clear what gaining bodhi means. We are accustomed to the translation 'enlightenment' for bodhi, but this is misleading for two reasons. First, it can be confused with the use of the word to describe the development in European thought and culture in the eighteenth century, and second, it suggests that light is being shed on something, whereas there is no hint of the meaning 'light' in the root budh- which underlies the word bodhi. The root means 'to wake up, to be awake, to be awakened', and a buddha is someone who has been awakened. Besides the ordinary sense of being awakened by something, e.g. a noise, it can also mean 'awakened to something'. The desire to get the idea of 'awakened' in English translations of buddha explains the rather peculiar Victorian quasi-poetical translation 'the wake' which we sometimes find."; Bikkhu Bodhi objects to this shift: "The classical Pali text on grammar, Saddanīti, assigns to this root the meanings of 'knowing (or understanding)', 'blossoming', and 'waking up', in that order of importance. The Pali-Sanskrit noun buddhi, which designates the intellect or faculty of cognition, is derived from budh, yet entails no sense of 'awakening'. Further, when we look at the ordinary use of verbs based on budh in the Pali suttas, we can see that these verbs mean 'to know, to understand, to recognize'. My paper cites several passages where rendering the verb as 'awakens' would stretch the English word beyond its ordinary limits. In those contexts, 'knows', 'understands', 'recognizes', or 'realizes' would fit much better. The verbs derived from budh that do mean 'awaken' are generally preceded by a prefix, but they are not used to refer to the Buddha's attainment of bodhi." (Bodhi 2020; Abrahams 2021); Buddhadasa (2017, p. 5) gives several translations, including "the knowing one": "This is how we understand 'Buddha' in Thailand, as the Awakened One, the Knowing One, and the Blossomed One.") (Note: A number of names are being used to refer to the Buddha; Siddhartha Gautama, Gotama Buddha: Buswell & Lopez (2014, p. 316), "Gautama": "Gautama. (P.) Gotama; The family name of the historical Buddha, also known as ŚĀKYAMUNI Buddha. ... In Pāli literature, he is more commonly referred to as Gotama Buddha; in Mahāyāna texts, Śākyamuni Buddha is more common."; /sɪˈdɑːrtə, -θə/; Sanskrit: [sɪddʱaːrtʰɐ ɡɐʊtɐmɐ] Gautama namely Gotama in Pali. Buswell & Lopez (2014, p. 817) "Siddhārtha": "Siddhārtha. (P. Siddhattha; T. Don grub; C. Xidaduo; J. Shiddatta/Shittatta; K. Siltalta ). In Sanskrit, "He Who Achieves His Goal", the personal name of GAUTAMA Buddha, also known as ŚĀKYAMUNI. In some accounts of the life of the Buddha, after his royal birth as the son of King ŚUDDHODANA, the BODHISATTVA was given this name and is referred to by that name during his life as a prince and his practice of asceticism. ... After his achievement of buddhahood, Siddhārtha is instead known as Gautama, Śākyamuni, or simply the TATHĀGATA."; [Buddha] Shakyamuni: Buswell & Lopez (2014, p. 741) "Śākyamuni": "Śākyamuni. (P. Sakkamuni; ... one of the most common epithets of GAUTAMA Buddha, especially in the MAHĀYĀNA traditions, where the name ŚĀKYAMUNI is used to distinguish the historical buddha from the myriad other buddhas who appear in the SŪTRAs."; Buddha Shakyamuni: from the middle of the 3rd century BCE, several Edicts of Ashoka (reigned c. 269–232 BCE) mention the Buddha and Buddhism (Bary (2011, p. 8), Fogelin (2015)). Particularly, Ashoka's Lumbini pillar inscription commemorates the Emperor's pilgrimage to Lumbini as the Buddha's birthplace, calling him the Buddha Shakyamuni (Brahmi script: 𑀩𑀼𑀥 𑀲𑀓𑁆𑀬𑀫𑀼𑀦𑀻 Bu-dha Sa-kya-mu-nī, "Buddha, Sage of the Shakyas") (In Ashoka's Rummindei Edict c. 260 BCE, in Hultzsch (1925, p. 164)); The Buddha: Keown (2003, p. 42) "Buddha (Skt; Pali)": "This is not a personal name but an epithet of those who have achieved enlightenment (*bodhi), the goal of the Buddhist religious life. Buddha comes from the *Sanskrit root 'budh', meaning to awaken, and the Buddhas are those who have awakened to the true nature of things as taught in the *Four Noble Truths. ... It is generally believed that there can never be more than one Buddha in any particular era, and the 'historical Buddha' of the present era was *Siddhartha Gautama. Numerous ahistorical Buddhas make an appearance in Mahayana literature."; "2013". Oxford English Dictionary (online ed.). Oxford University Press. p. chapter "Buddha, n.". (Subscription or participating institution membership required.): "Also with the: (a title for) Siddhārtha Gautama, or Śākyamuni, a spiritual teacher from South Asia on whose teachings Buddhism is based, and who is believed to have been born in what is now Nepal and flourished in what is now Bihar, north-eastern India, during the 5th cent. b.c. Also: (a title given to) any Buddhist teacher regarded as having attained full awakening or enlightenment.") was a wandering religious teacher who lived in the eastern Indo-Gangetic Plains during the 6th or 5th century BCE and founded Buddhism. According to Buddhist legends, he was born in Lumbini, in what is now Nepal, to royal parents of the Shakya clan, but renounced his home life to live as a wandering ascetic. (Note: Buswell & Lopez 2014, p. entry "Sakyamuni" refer to the Ariyapariyesana Sutta, noting: "Buddha's quest for enlightenment occurs in the ARIYAPARIYESANĀSUTTA. It is noteworthy that many of the most familiar events in the Buddha's life are absent in some of the early accounts." The Ariyapariyesana Sutta says: "So, at a later time, while still young, a black-haired young man endowed with the blessings of youth in the first stage of life — and while my parents, unwilling, were crying with tears streaming down their faces — I shaved off my hair & beard, put on the ochre robe and went forth from the home life into homelessness.) After leading a life of mendicancy, asceticism, and meditation, he attained nirvana at Bodh Gaya in what is now Bihar, India. The Buddha then wandered through the lower Indo-Gangetic Plain, teaching and building a monastic order (sangha). Buddhist tradition holds he died in Kushinagar (in modern day Uttar Pradesh, India) and reached parinirvana ("final release from conditioned existence"). (Note: The final dissolution of the aggregates that constitute a living person, the end of rebirth, the coming together again of those skandhas.Gethin 1998, p. 76)

According to Buddhist tradition, the Buddha taught a Middle Way between sensual indulgence and severe asceticism, leading to freedom from ignorance, craving, rebirth, and suffering. His core teachings are summarised in the Four Noble Truths and the Noble Eightfold Path, a training of the mind that includes ethical training and kindness toward others, and meditative practices such as sense restraint, mindfulness, and dhyana (meditation proper). Another key element of his teachings are the concepts of the five skandhas and dependent origination, describing how all dharmas (both mental states and concrete 'things') come into being, and cease to be, depending on other dharmas, lacking an existence on their own (svabhava).

While in the Nikayas, he frequently refers to himself as the Tathāgata; the earliest attestation of the title Buddha is from the 3rd century BCE, meaning 'Awakened One' or 'Enlightened One'. His teachings were compiled by the Buddhist community into the Vinaya Piṭaka, containing codes for monastic discipline, and the Sūtra Piṭaka, a collection of discourses attributed to him. These were passed down in Middle Indo-Aryan dialects through an oral tradition. Later generations composed additional texts, such as systematic treatises known as Abhidharma, biographies of the Buddha, collections of stories about his past lives known as Jataka tales, and additional discourses, i.e., the Mahāyāna sūtras.

Buddhism evolved into a variety of traditions and practices, represented by Theravāda, Mahāyāna and Vajrayāna, and spread beyond the Indian subcontinent. While Buddhism declined in India, and largely disappeared after the 8th century CE due to a loss of popular and economic support, it grew more prominent in Southeast and East Asia.

== Etymology, names and titles ==
=== Siddhārtha Gautama and Buddha Shakyamuni ===
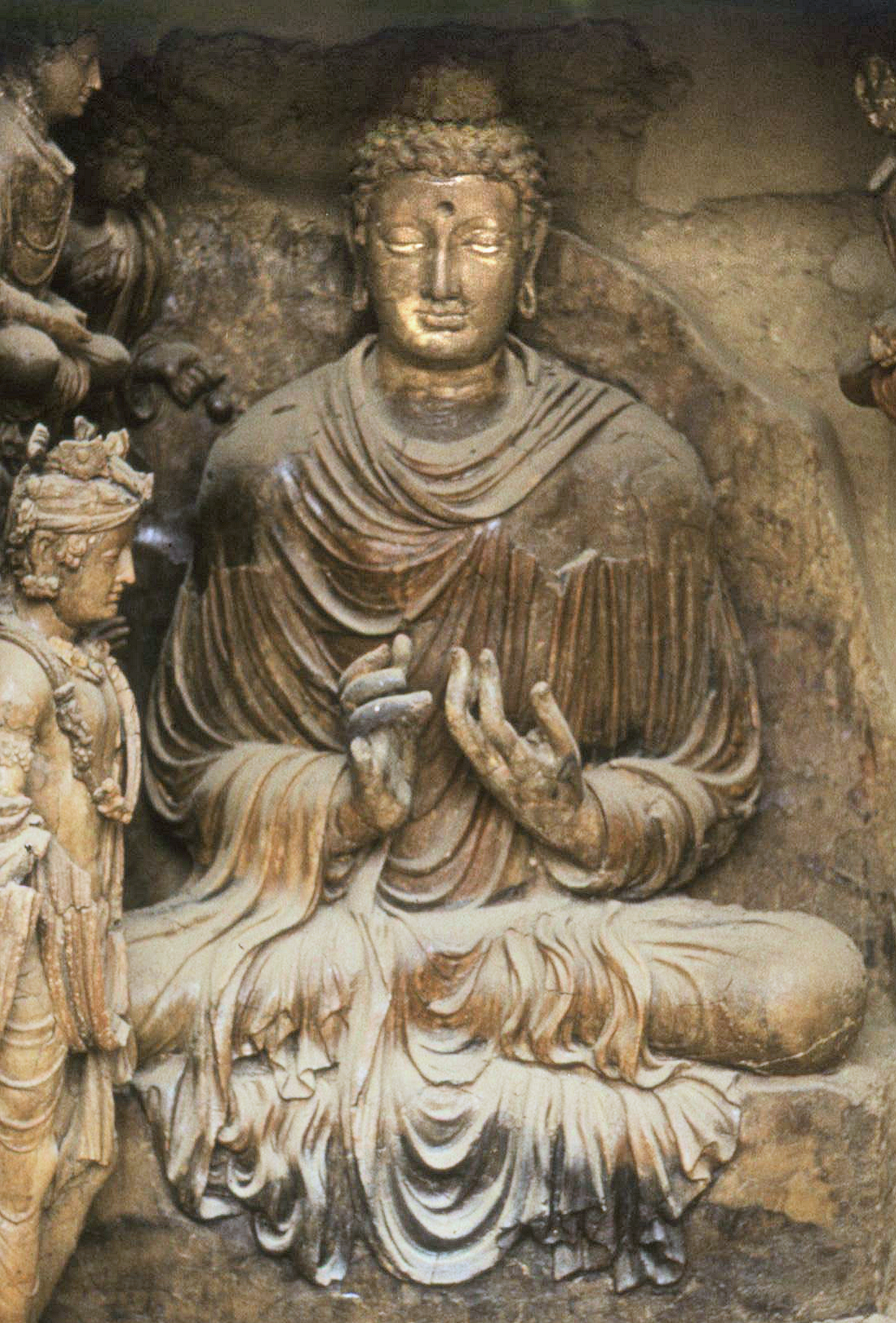
The Buddha, Tapa Shotor monastery in Hadda, Afghanistan, 2nd century CE

According to Donald Lopez Jr. "he tended to be known as either Buddha or Sakyamuni in China, Korea, Japan, and Tibet, and as either Gotama Buddha or Samana Gotama ('the ascetic Gotama') in Sri Lanka and Southeast Asia."

Buddha, "Awakened One" or "Enlightened One", is the masculine form of budh (बुध्), "to wake, be awake, observe, heed, attend, learn, become aware of, to know, be conscious again", "to awaken" "'to open up' (as does a flower)", "one who has awakened from the deep sleep of ignorance and opened his consciousness to encompass all objects of knowledge". It is not a personal name, but a title for those who have attained bodhi (awakening, enlightenment). Buddhi, the power to "form and retain concepts, reason, discern, judge, comprehend, understand", is the faculty which discerns truth (satya) from falsehood.

The name of his clan was Gautama (Pali: Gotama). His given name, "Siddhārtha" (the Sanskrit form); the Pali rendering is "Siddhattha"; in Tibetan it is "Dhondup"; in Chinese "Xidaduo"; in Japanese "Shiddatta/Shittatta"; in Korean "Siltalta" means "He Who Achieves His Goal" (Siddhi). The clan name of Gautama means "descendant of Gotama", "Gotama" meaning "one who has the most light", or "one who has most cows" and comes from the fact that Kshatriya clans adopted the names of their house priests.

While the term Buddha is used in the Agamas and the Pali Canon, the oldest surviving written records of the term Buddha is from the middle of the 3rd century BCE, when several Edicts of Ashoka (reigned c. 269–232 BCE) mention the Buddha and Buddhism. Ashoka's Lumbini pillar inscription commemorates the Emperor's pilgrimage to Lumbini as the Buddha's birthplace, calling him the Buddha Shakyamuni (Note: Sanskrit pronunciation: [ɕɑːkjəmuni]) (Brahmi script: 𑀩𑀼𑀥 𑀲𑀓𑁆𑀬𑀫𑀼𑀦𑀻 Bu-dha Sa-kya-mu-nī. Śākyamuni, Sakyamuni, or Shakyamuni (Sanskrit: शाक्यमुनि, [ɕaːkjɐmʊnɪ]) means "Sage of the Shakyas".

=== Tathāgata ===
Tathāgata (Pali; Pali: [tɐˈtʰaːɡɐtɐ]) is a term the Buddha commonly used when referring to himself or other Buddhas in the Pāli Canon. The exact meaning of the term is unknown, but it is often thought to mean either "one who has thus gone" (tathā-gata), "one who has thus come" (tathā-āgata), or sometimes "one who has thus not gone" (tathā-agata). This is interpreted as signifying that the Tathāgata is beyond all coming and going—beyond all transitory phenomena. A tathāgata is "immeasurable", "inscrutable", "hard to fathom", and "not apprehended".

=== Other epithets ===
A list of other epithets is commonly seen together in canonical texts and depicts some of his perfected qualities:

- Bhagavato (Bhagavan) – The Blessed one, one of the most used epithets, together with tathāgata
- Sammasambuddho – Perfectly self-awakened
- Vijja-carana-sampano – Endowed with higher knowledge and ideal conduct.
- Sugata – Well-gone or well-spoken.
- Lokavidu – Knower of the many worlds.
- Anuttaro Purisa-damma-sarathi – Unexcelled trainer of untrained people.
- Satthadeva-Manussanam – Teacher of gods and humans.
- Araham – Worthy of homage. An Arahant is "one with taints destroyed, who has lived the holy life, done what had to be done, laid down the burden, reached the true goal, destroyed the fetters of being, and is completely liberated through final knowledge".
- Jina – Conqueror. Although the term is more commonly used to name an individual who has attained liberation in the religion Jainism, it is also an alternative title for the Buddha.

The Pali Canon also contains numerous other titles and epithets for the Buddha, including: All-seeing, All-transcending sage, Bull among men, The Caravan leader, Dispeller of darkness, The Eye, Foremost of charioteers, Foremost of those who can cross, King of the Dharma (Dharmaraja), Kinsman of the Sun, Helper of the World (Lokanatha), Lion (Siha), Lord of the Dhamma, Of excellent wisdom (Varapañña), Radiant One, Torchbearer of mankind, Unsurpassed doctor and surgeon, Victor in battle, and Wielder of power. Another epithet, used at inscriptions throughout South and Southeast Asia, is Maha sramana, "great sramana" (ascetic, renunciate).

== Sources ==
=== Historical sources ===
==== Pali suttas ====
On the basis of philological evidence, Indologist and Pāli expert Oskar von Hinüber says that some of the Pāli suttas have retained very archaic place-names, syntax, and historical data from close to the Buddha's lifetime, including the Mahāparinibbāṇa Sutta which contains a detailed account of the Buddha's final days. Hinüber proposes a composition date of no later than 350–320 BCE for this text, which would allow for a "true historical memory" of the events approximately 60 years prior if the Short Chronology for the Buddha's lifetime is accepted (but he also points out that such a text was originally intended more as hagiography than as an exact historical record of events).

John S. Strong sees certain biographical fragments in the canonical texts preserved in Pāli, as well as Chinese, Tibetan and Sanskrit as the earliest material. These include texts such as the "Discourse on the Noble Quest" (Ariyapariyesanā-sutta) and its parallels in other languages.

==== Pillar and rock inscriptions ====
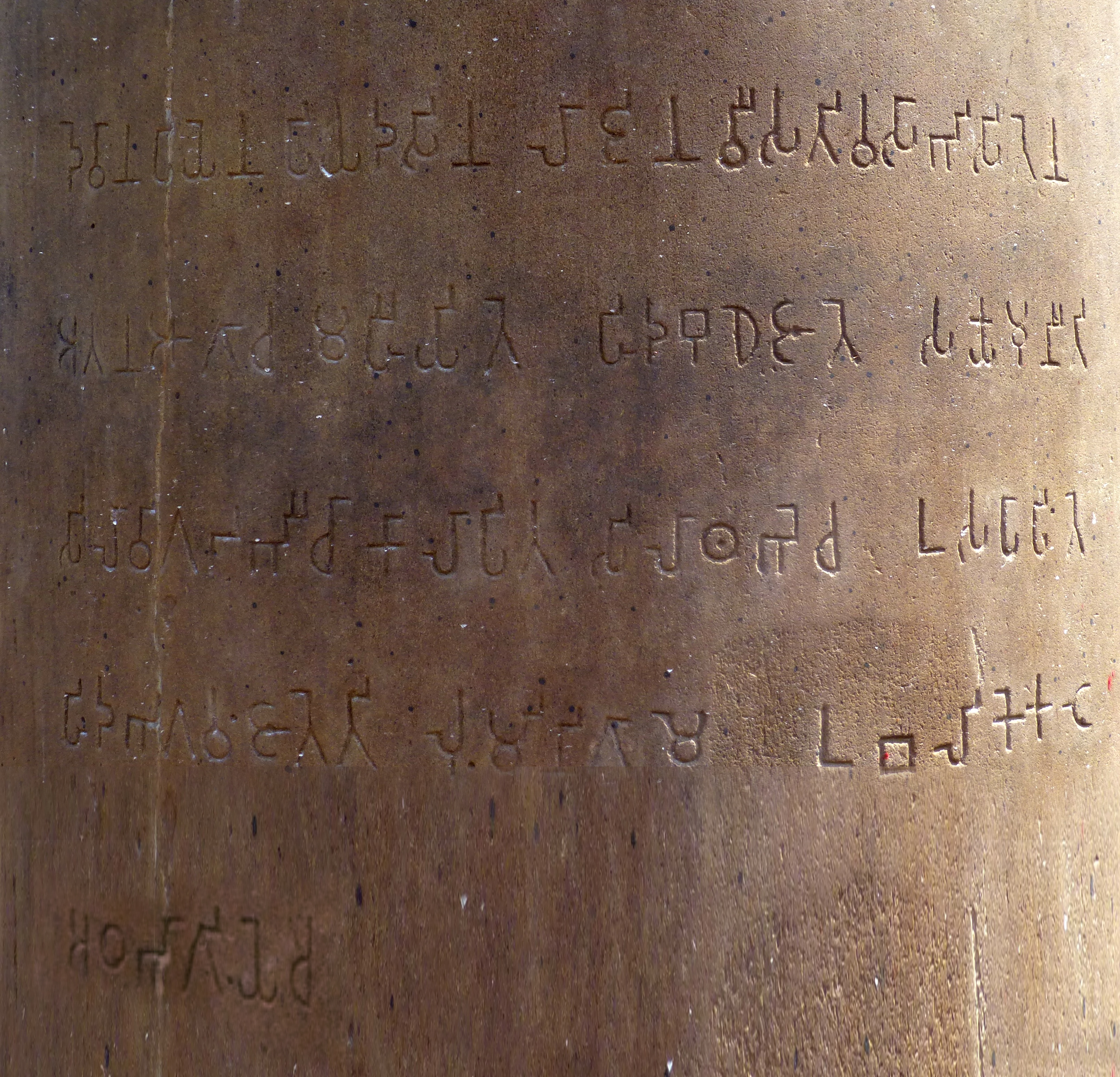
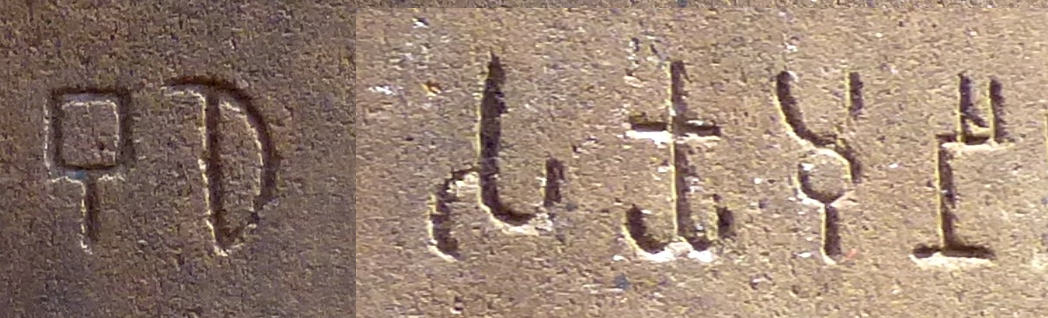
Ashoka's Lumbini pillar inscription (c. 250 BCE), with the words "Bu-dhe" (𑀩𑀼𑀥𑁂, the Buddha) and "Sa-kya-mu-nī " (𑀲𑀓𑁆𑀬𑀫𑀼𑀦𑀻, "Sage of the Shakyas") in the Brahmi script

No written records about Gautama were found from his lifetime or from the one or two centuries thereafter. But from the middle of the 3rd century BCE, several Edicts of Ashoka (reigned c. 268 to 232 BCE) mention the Buddha and Buddhism. Particularly, Ashoka's Lumbini pillar inscription commemorates the Emperor's pilgrimage to Lumbini as the Buddha's birthplace, calling him the Buddha Shakyamuni (Brahmi script: 𑀩𑀼𑀥 𑀲𑀓𑁆𑀬𑀫𑀼𑀦𑀻 Bu-dha Sa-kya-mu-nī, "Buddha, Sage of the Shakyas"). (Note: In Ashoka's Rummindei Edict c. 260 BCE, in Hultzsch (1925, p. 164)) Another one of his edicts (Minor Rock Edict No. 3) mentions the titles of several Dhamma texts (in Buddhism, "dhamma" is another word for "dharma"), establishing the existence of a written Buddhist tradition at least by the time of the Maurya era. These texts may be the precursor of the Pāli Canon. (Note: Minor Rock Edict Nb3: "These Dhamma texts – Extracts from the Discipline, the Noble Way of Life, the Fears to Come, the Poem on the Silent Sage, the Discourse on the Pure Life, Upatisa's Questions, and the Advice to Rahula which was spoken by the Buddha concerning false speech – these Dhamma texts, reverend sirs, I desire that all the monks and nuns may constantly listen to and remember. Likewise the laymen and laywomen." Dhammika: "There is disagreement amongst scholars concerning which Pali suttas correspond to some of the text. Vinaya samukose: probably the Atthavasa Vagga, Anguttara Nikaya, 1:98–100. Aliya vasani: either the Ariyavasa Sutta, Anguttara Nikaya, V:29, or the Ariyavamsa Sutta, Anguttara Nikaya, II: 27–28. Anagata bhayani: probably the Anagata Sutta, Anguttara Nikaya, III:100. Muni gatha: Muni Sutta, Sutta Nipata 207–21. Upatisa pasine: Sariputta Sutta, Sutta Nipata 955–75. Laghulavade: Rahulavada Sutta, Majjhima Nikaya, I:421." See Readings Selected by King Asoka for a translation of these texts.)

"Sakamuni" is also mentioned in a relief of Bharhut, dated to c. 100 BCE, in relation with his illumination and the Bodhi tree, with the inscription Bhagavato Sakamunino Bodho ("The illumination of the Blessed Sakamuni").

==== Oldest surviving manuscripts ====
The oldest surviving Buddhist manuscripts are the Gandhāran Buddhist texts, found in Gandhara (corresponding to modern northwestern Pakistan and eastern Afghanistan) and written in Gāndhārī, they date from the first century BCE to the third century CE.

=== Biographical sources ===
Early canonical sources include the Ariyapariyesana Sutta (MN 26), the Mahāparinibbāṇa Sutta (DN 16), the Mahāsaccaka-sutta (MN 36), the Mahapadana Sutta (DN 14), and the Achariyabhuta Sutta (MN 123), which include selective accounts that may be older, but are not full biographies. The Jātaka tales retell previous lives of Gautama as a bodhisattva, and the first collection of these can be dated among the earliest Buddhist texts. The Mahāpadāna Sutta and Achariyabhuta Sutta both recount miraculous events surrounding Gautama's birth, such as the bodhisattva's descent from the Tuṣita Heaven into his mother's womb.

The sources which present a complete picture of the life of Siddhārtha Gautama are a variety of different, and sometimes conflicting, traditional biographies from a later date. These include the Buddhacarita, Lalitavistara Sūtra, Mahāvastu, and the Nidānakathā. Of these, the Buddhacarita is the earliest full biography, an epic poem written by the poet Aśvaghoṣa in the first century CE. The Lalitavistara Sūtra is the next oldest biography, a Mahāyāna/Sarvāstivāda biography dating to the 3rd century CE.

The Mahāvastu from the Mahāsāṃghika Lokottaravāda tradition is another major biography, composed incrementally until perhaps the 4th century CE. The Dharmaguptaka biography of the Buddha is the most exhaustive, and is entitled the Abhiniṣkramaṇa Sūtra, and various Chinese translations of this date between the 3rd and 6th century CE. The Nidānakathā is from the Theravada tradition in Sri Lanka and was composed in the 5th century by Buddhaghoṣa.

== Historical person ==
=== Understanding the historical person ===
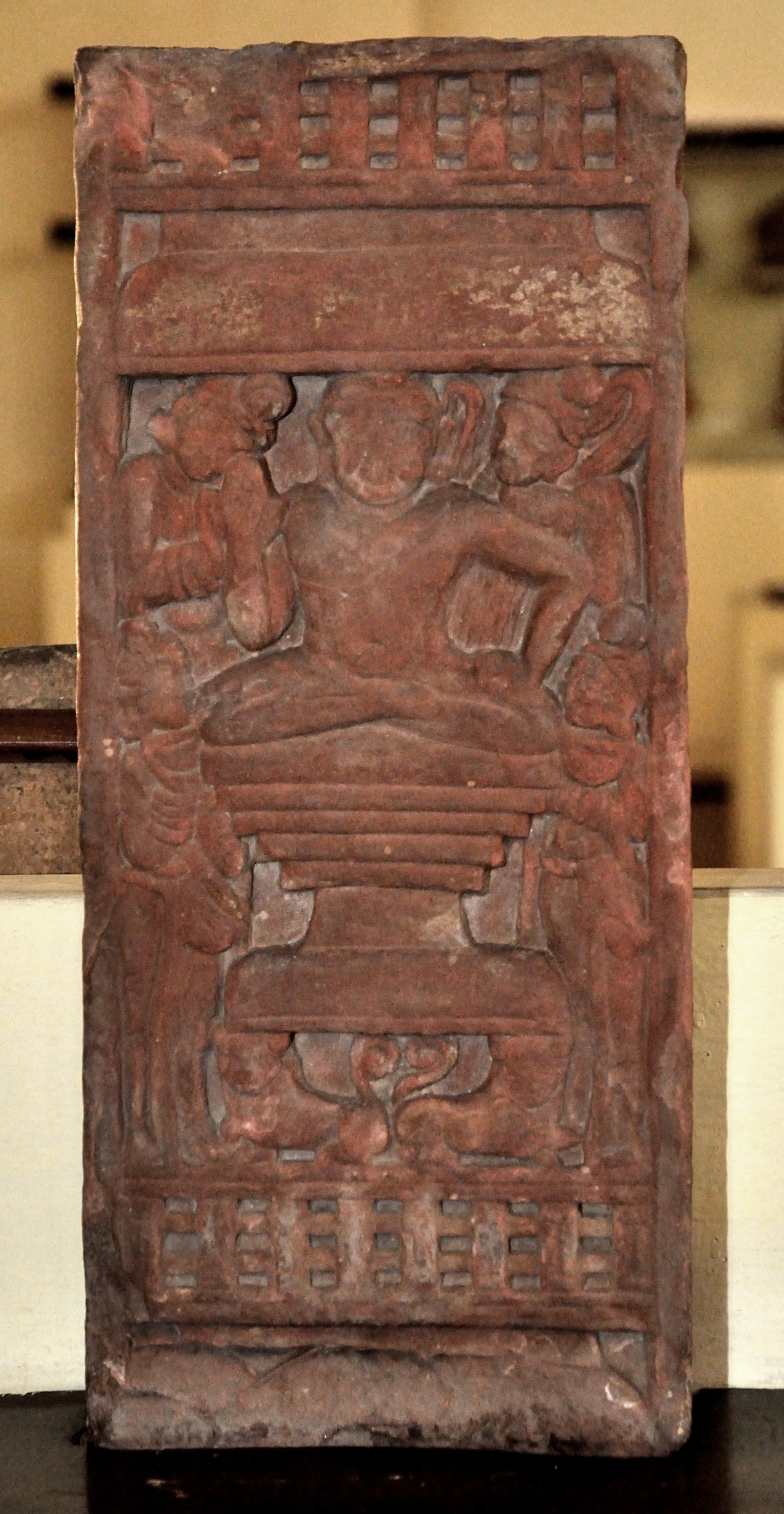
The "Isapur Buddha", probably the earliest known representation of the Buddha (possibly together with the Butkara seated Buddha statue at the Butkara Stupa, Swat), on a railing post, dated to circa 15 CE.

Scholars are hesitant to make claims about the historical facts of the Buddha's life. Most of them accept that the Buddha lived, taught, and founded a monastic order during the Mahajanapada period, specifically during the reign of Bimbisara, ruler of Magadha, and died during the reign of Bimbisara's successor Ajatashatru, thus also making him a contemporary of Mahavira, the Jain tirthankara.

There is less consensus on the veracity of many details contained in traditional biographies, as "Buddhist scholars [...] have mostly given up trying to understand the historical person." The earliest versions of Buddhist biographical texts that we have already contain many supernatural, mythical, or legendary elements. In the 19th century, some scholars simply omitted these from their accounts of the life, so that "the image projected was of a Buddha who was a rational, socratic teacher—a great person perhaps, but a more or less ordinary human being". More recent scholars tend to see such demythologisers as remythologisers, "creating a Buddha that appealed to them, by eliding one that did not".

Rupert Gethin contends that "as the Buddhist tradition tells it, the story of the life of the Buddha is not history nor meant to be," and instead his life story has a paradigmatic value communicating transhistorical truths, not just historical events.

=== Dating ===
The dates of Gautama's birth and death are uncertain. Within the Eastern Buddhist tradition of China, Vietnam, Korea and Japan, the traditional date for Buddha's death was 949 BCE, but according to the Ka-tan system of the Kalachakra tradition, Buddha's death was about 833 BCE.

Buddhist texts present two chronologies which have been used to date the lifetime of the Buddha. The "long chronology", from Sri Lankan chronicles, states the Buddha had a lifespan of 80 years and died 218 years before Asoka's coronation, thus from which it is inferred that he was born about 298 years before the coronation. According to these chronicles, Asoka was crowned in 326 BCE, which gives Buddha's lifespan as 624–544 BCE, and are the accepted dates in Sri Lanka and South-East Asia. Alternatively, most scholars who also accept the long chronology but date Asoka's coronation around 268 BCE (based on Greek evidence) put the Buddha's lifespan later at 566–486 BCE.

However, the "short chronology", from Indian sources and their Chinese and Tibetan translations, while also giving a lifespan of 80 years, place the Buddha's death 100 years before Asoka's coronation, from which his birth is inferred at about 180 years before the coronation. Following the Greek sources of Asoka's coronation as 268 BCE, this dates the Buddha's lifespan even later as 448–368 BCE.

Most historians in the early 20th century use the earlier dates of 563–483 BCE, differing from the long chronology based on Greek evidence by just three years. More recently, there are attempts to put his death midway between the long chronology's 480s BCE and the short chronology's 360s BCE, so circa 410 BCE. At a symposium on this question held in 1988, the majority of those who presented gave dates within 20 years either side of 400 BCE for the Buddha's death. These alternative chronologies, however, have not been accepted by all historians. (Note: In 2013, archaeologist Robert Coningham found the remains of a Bodhigara, a tree shrine, dated to 550 BCE at the Maya Devi Temple, Lumbini, speculating that it may be a Buddhist shrine. If so, this may push back the Buddha's birth date. Archaeologists caution that the shrine may represent pre-Buddhist tree worship, and that further research is needed. Richard Gombrich has dismissed Coningham's speculations as "a fantasy", noting that Coningham lacks the necessary expertise on the history of early Buddhism. Geoffrey Samuel notes that several locations of both early Buddhism and Jainism are closely related to Yaksha-worship, that several Yakshas were "converted" to Buddhism, a well-known example being Vajrapani, and that several Yaksha-shrines, where trees were worshipped, were converted into Buddhist holy places.)

The dating of Bimbisara and Ajatashatru also depends on the long or short chronology. In the long chrononology, Bimbisara reigned c. 558 – c. 492 BCE, and died 492 BCE, while Ajatashatru reigned c. 492 – c. 460 BCE. In the short chronology Bimbisara reigned c. 400 BCE, (Note: Keay 2011: "The date [of Buddha's meeting with Bimbisara] (given the Buddhist 'short chronology') must have been around 400 BCE[...] He was now in the middle of his reign.") while Ajatashatru died between c. 380 BCE and 330 BCE. According to historian K. T. S. Sarao, a proponent of the Short Chronology wherein the Buddha's lifespan was c. 477–397 BCE, it can be estimated that Bimbisara was reigning c. 457–405 BCE, and Ajatashatru was reigning c. 405–373 BCE.

=== Archaeological evidence ===
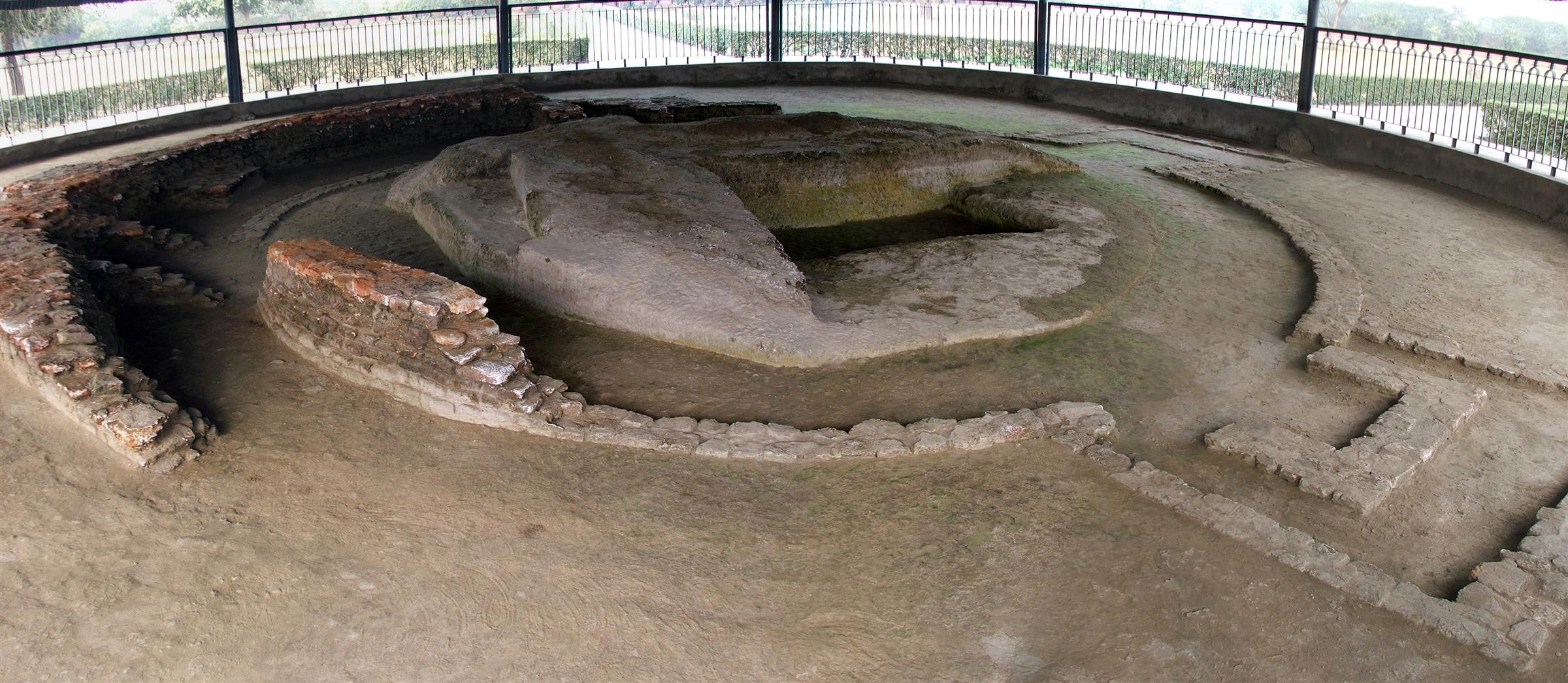
The Relic Stupa of Vaishali, 5th century BCE which held either the Buddha's ashes or part of his relics

Two archaeological sites have been linked to the time of the Buddha around the 5th century BCE. The first of these is the Relic Stupa of Vaishali situated in the Indian state of Bihar which is considered to be the earliest archaeologically known stupa. The stupa itself is made of brick and has a clay core that has been enlarged several times. The excavators noted that the final brick addition was contemporary with a nearby 3rd century BCE Mauryan Empire column which would therefore mean that the clay core predated the Mauryans. They also found that the relics within the stupa had been removed at a later date. This would match up with the history of Ashoka who is said to have redistributed the relics of the Buddha in the 3rd century BCE.

The second site is a small wooden structure that was excavated in Lumbini around 2015 which also contained traces of tree roots. Carbon dating has been used to date the structure and the roots to possibly the sixth century BCE.

=== Historical context ===
==== Shakyas ====
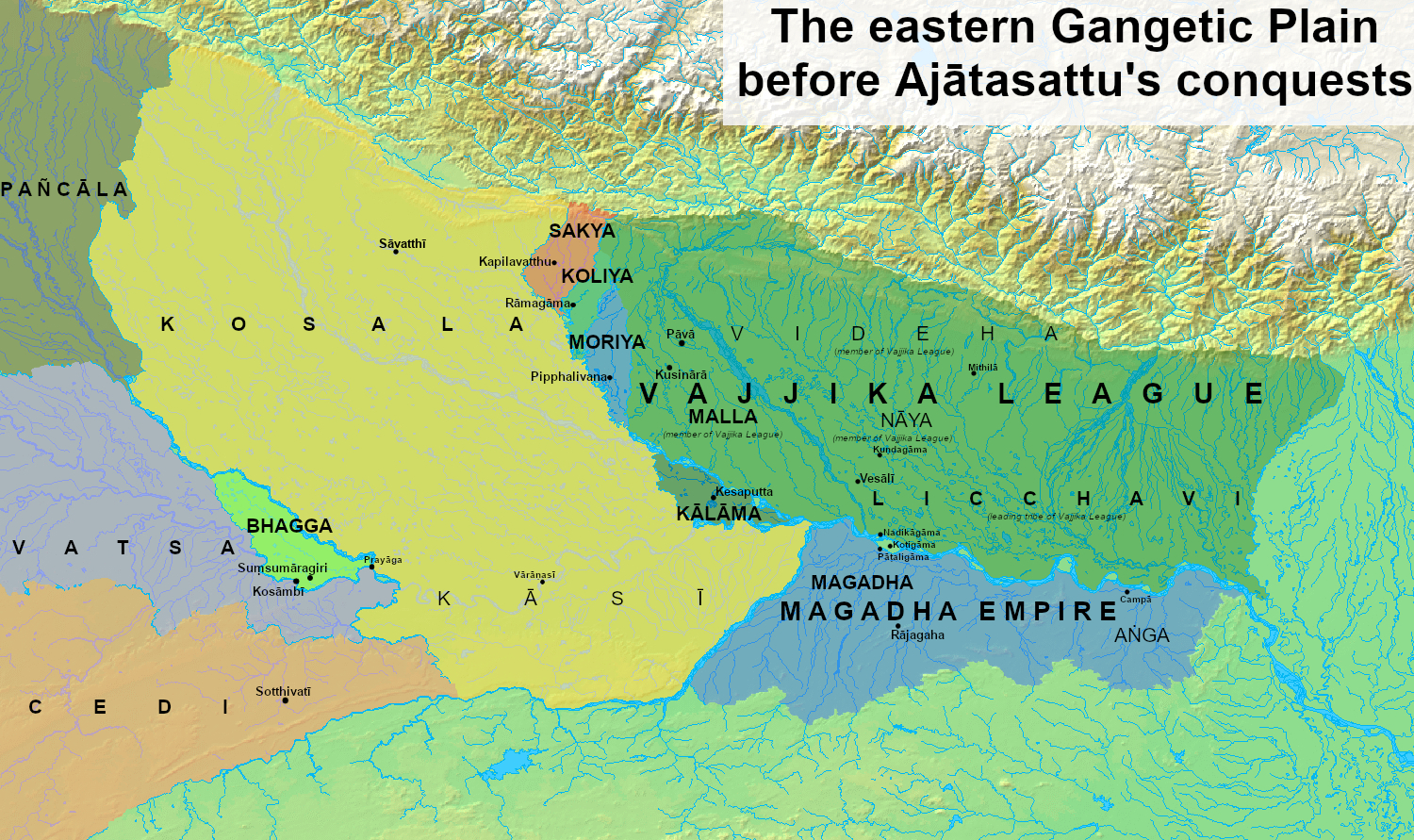
The location of the Shakyas during the time of the Buddha

According to the Buddhist tradition, Shakyamuni Buddha was a Shakya, a sub-Himalayan ethnicity and clan of north-eastern region of the Indian subcontinent. (Note: Shakya: Warder 2000, p. 45: "The Buddha [...] was born in the Sakya Republic, which was the city state of Kapilavastu, a very small state just inside the modern state boundary of Nepal against the Northern Indian frontier.; Walshe 1995, p. 20: "He belonged to the Sakya clan dwelling on the edge of the Himalayas, his actual birthplace being a few kilometres north of the present-day Northern Indian border, in Nepal. His father was, in fact, an elected chief of the clan rather than the king he was later made out to be, though his title was raja—a term which only partly corresponds to our word 'king'. Some of the states of North India at that time were kingdoms and others republics, and the Sakyan republic was subject to the powerful king of neighbouring Kosala, which lay to the south".) The Shakya community was on the periphery, both geographically and culturally, of the eastern Indian subcontinent in the 5th century BCE. The community, though describable as a small republic, was probably an oligarchy, with his father as the elected chieftain or oligarch. The Shakyas were widely considered to be non-Vedic (and, hence impure) in Brahminic texts; their origins remain speculative and debated. Bronkhorst terms this culture, which grew alongside Āryāvarta without being affected by the flourish of Brahminism, as Greater Magadha.

The Buddha's tribe of origin, the Shakyas, seems to have had non-Vedic religious practices which persist in Buddhism, such as the veneration of trees and sacred groves, and the worship of tree spirits (yakshas) and serpent beings (nāgas). They also seem to have built burial mounds called stupas. Tree veneration remains important in Buddhism today, particularly in the practice of venerating Bodhi trees. Likewise, yakshas and nāgas have remained important figures in Buddhist religious practices and mythology.

==== Shramanas ====
The Buddha's lifetime coincided with the flourishing of influential śramaṇa schools of thought like Ājīvika, Cārvāka, Jainism, and Ajñana. The Brahmajala Sutta records sixty-two such schools of thought. In this context, a śramaṇa refers to one who labours, toils or exerts themselves (for some higher or religious purpose). It was also the age of influential thinkers like Mahavira, Pūraṇa Kassapa, Makkhali Gosāla, Ajita Kesakambalī, Pakudha Kaccāyana, and Sañjaya Belaṭṭhaputta, as recorded in Samaññaphala Sutta, with whose viewpoints the Buddha must have been acquainted. (Note: According to Alexander Berzin, "Buddhism developed as a shramana school that accepted rebirth under the force of karma, while rejecting the existence of the type of soul that other schools asserted. In addition, the Buddha accepted as parts of the path to liberation the use of logic and reasoning, as well as ethical behaviour, but not to the degree of Jain asceticism. In this way, Buddhism avoided the extremes of the previous four shramana schools.")

Śāriputra and Moggallāna, two of the foremost disciples of the Buddha, were formerly the foremost disciples of Sañjaya Belaṭṭhaputta, the sceptic. The Pāli canon frequently depicts Buddha engaging in debate with the adherents of rival schools of thought. There is philological evidence to suggest that the two masters, Alara Kalama and Uddaka Rāmaputta, were historical figures and they most probably taught Buddha two different forms of meditative techniques. Thus, Buddha was just one of the many śramaṇa philosophers of that time. In an era where holiness of person was judged by their level of asceticism, Buddha was a reformist within the śramaṇa movement, rather than a reactionary against Vedic Brahminism.

Coningham and Young note that both Jains and Buddhists used stupas, while tree shrines can be found in both Buddhism and Hinduism.

==== Urban environment and egalitarianism ====
The rise of Buddhism coincided with the Second Urbanisation, in which the Ganges Basin was settled and cities grew, in which egalitarianism prevailed. According to Thapar, the Buddha's teachings were "also a response to the historical changes of the time, among which were the emergence of the state and the growth of urban centres". While the Buddhist mendicants renounced society, they lived close to the villages and cities, depending for alms-givings on lay supporters.

According to Dyson, the Ganges basin was settled from the north-west and the south-east, as well as from within, "[coming] together in what is now Bihar (the location of Pataliputra)". The Ganges basin was densely forested, and the population grew when new areas were deforestated and cultivated. The society of the middle Ganges basin lay on "the outer fringe of Aryan cultural influence", and differed significantly from the Aryan society of the western Ganges basin. According to Stein and Burton, "[t]he gods of the brahmanical sacrificial cult were not rejected so much as ignored by Buddhists and their contemporaries." Jainism and Buddhism opposed the social stratification of Brahmanism, and their egalitarism prevailed in the cities of the middle Ganges basin. This "allowed Jains and Buddhists to engage in trade more easily than Brahmans, who were forced to follow strict caste prohibitions."

== Semi-legendary biography ==
=== Nature of traditional depictions ===
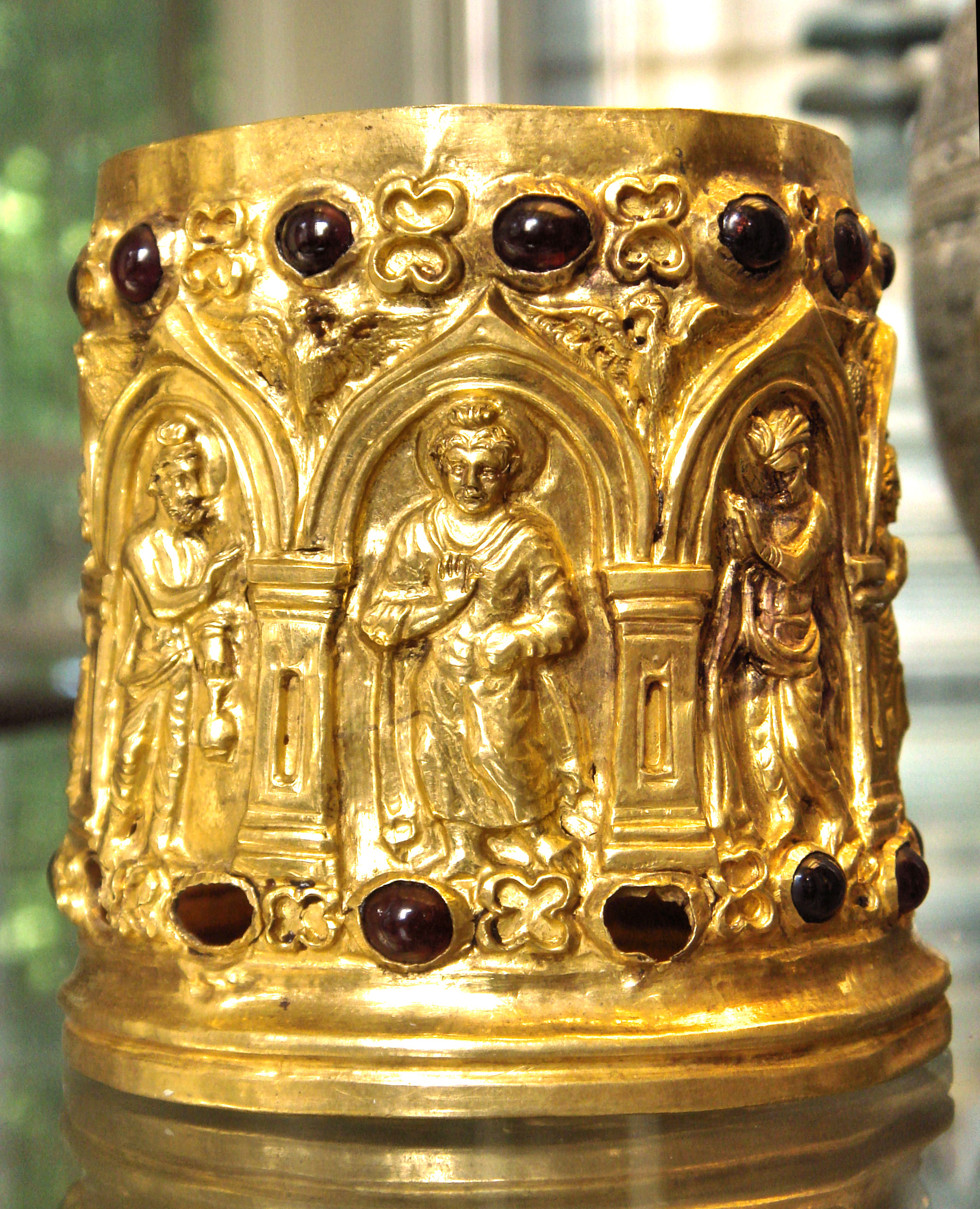
One of the earliest anthropomorphic representations of the Buddha, here surrounded by Brahma (left) and Śakra (right). Bimaran Casket, mid-1st century CE, British Museum.

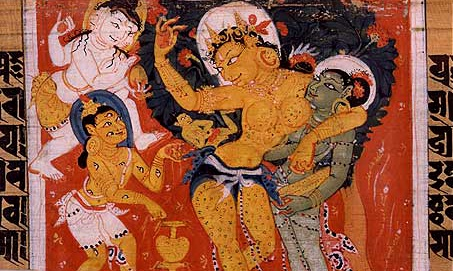
Māyā miraculously giving birth to Siddhārtha. Sanskrit, palm-leaf manuscript. Nālandā, Bihar, India. Pāla period

In the earliest Buddhist texts, the nikāyas and āgamas, the Buddha is not depicted as possessing omniscience (sabbaññu) nor is he depicted as being an eternal transcendent (lokottara) being. According to Bhikkhu Analayo, ideas of the Buddha's omniscience (along with an increasing tendency to deify him and his biography) are found only later, in the Mahayana sutras and later Pali commentaries or texts such as the Mahāvastu. In the Sandaka Sutta, the Buddha's disciple Ananda outlines an argument against the claims of teachers who say they are all knowing while in the Tevijjavacchagotta Sutta the Buddha himself states that he has never made a claim to being omniscient, instead he claimed to have the "higher knowledges" (abhijñā). The earliest biographical material from the Pali Nikayas focuses on the Buddha's life as a śramaṇa, his search for enlightenment under various teachers such as Alara Kalama and his forty-five-year career as a teacher.

Traditional biographies of Gautama often include numerous miracles, omens, and supernatural events. The character of the Buddha in these traditional biographies is often that of a fully transcendent (Skt. lokottara) and perfected being who is unencumbered by the mundane world. In the Mahāvastu, over the course of many lives, Gautama is said to have developed supramundane abilities including: a painless birth conceived without intercourse; no need for sleep, food, medicine, or bathing, although engaging in such "in conformity with the world"; omniscience, and the ability to "suppress karma". As noted by Andrew Skilton, the Buddha was often described as being superhuman, including descriptions of him having the 32 major and 80 minor marks of a "great man", and the idea that the Buddha could live for as long as an aeon if he wished (see DN 16).

The ancient Indians were generally unconcerned with chronologies, being more focused on philosophy. Buddhist texts reflect this tendency, providing a clearer picture of what Gautama may have taught than of the dates of the events in his life. These texts contain descriptions of the culture and daily life of ancient India which can be corroborated from the Jain scriptures, and make the Buddha's time the earliest period in Indian history for which significant accounts exist. British author Karen Armstrong writes that although there is very little information that can be considered historically sound, we can be reasonably confident that Siddhārtha Gautama did exist as a historical figure. Michael Carrithers goes further, stating that the most general outline of "birth, maturity, renunciation, search, awakening and liberation, teaching, death" must be true.

=== Previous lives ===
Legendary biographies like the Pali Buddhavaṃsa and the Sanskrit Jātakamālā depict the Buddha's (referred to as "bodhisattva" before his awakening) career as spanning hundreds of lifetimes before his last birth as Gautama. Many of these previous lives are narrated in the Jatakas, which consists of 547 stories. The format of a Jataka typically begins by telling a story in the present which is then explained by a story of someone's previous life.

Besides imbuing the pre-Buddhist past with a deep karmic history, the Jatakas also serve to explain the bodhisattva's (the Buddha-to-be) path to Buddhahood. In biographies like the Buddhavaṃsa, this path is described as long and arduous, taking "four incalculable ages" (asamkheyyas).

In these legendary biographies, the bodhisattva goes through many different births (animal and human), is inspired by his meeting of past Buddhas, and then makes a series of resolves or vows (pranidhana) to become a Buddha himself. Then he begins to receive predictions by past Buddhas. One of the most popular of these stories is his meeting with Dipankara Buddha, who gives the bodhisattva a prediction of future Buddhahood.

Another theme found in the Pali Jataka Commentary (Jātakaṭṭhakathā) and the Sanskrit Jātakamālā is how the Buddha-to-be had to practice several "perfections" (pāramitā) to reach Buddhahood. The Jatakas also sometimes depict negative actions done in previous lives by the bodhisattva, which explain difficulties he experienced in his final life as Gautama.

=== Birth and early life ===
A map showing Lumbini and other major Buddhist sites in India. Lumbini (present-day Nepal), is the birthplace of the Buddha, and is also a holy place for many non-Buddhists.

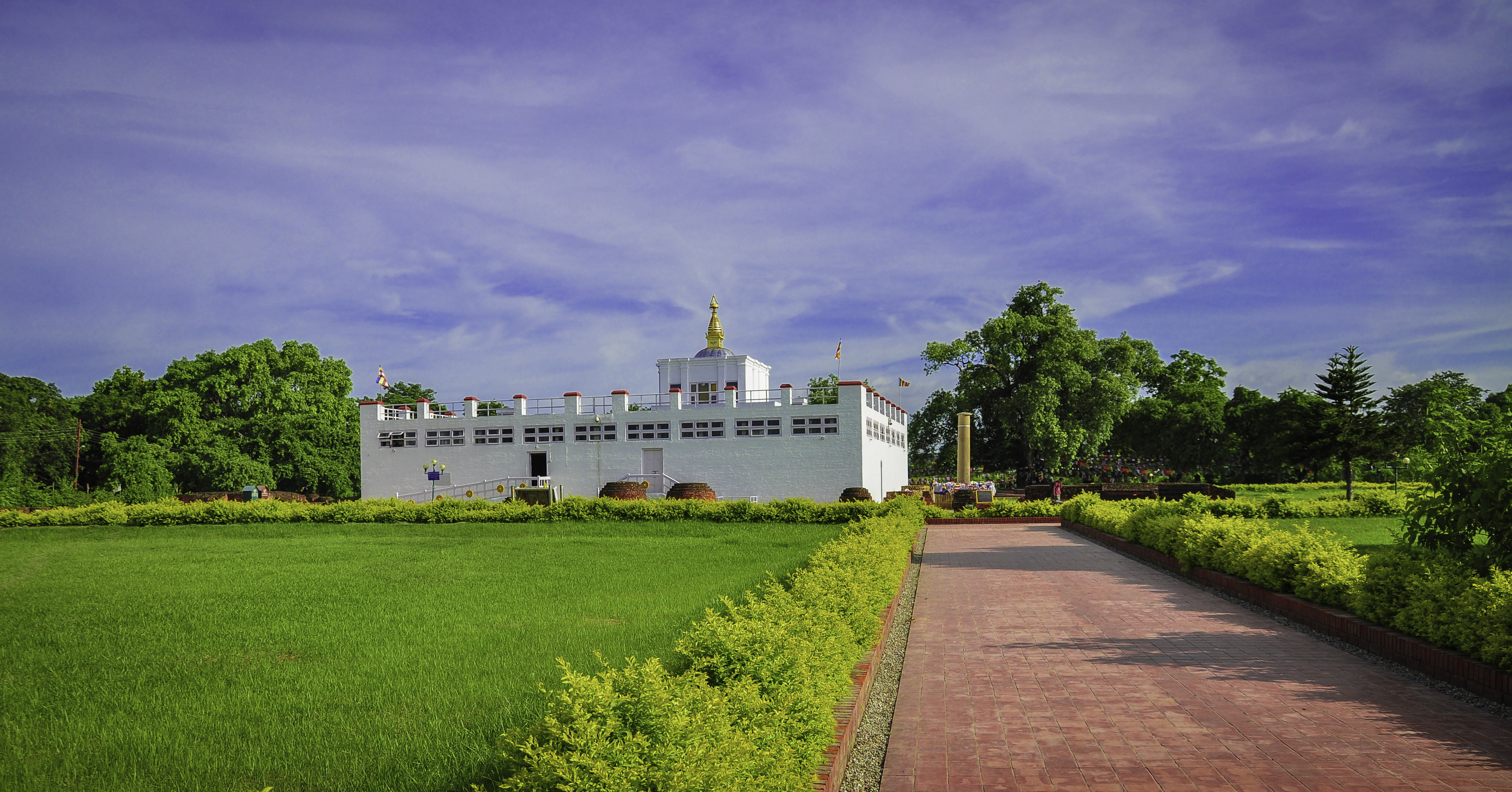
Mayadevi Temple marking the Buddha's birthplace in Lumbini

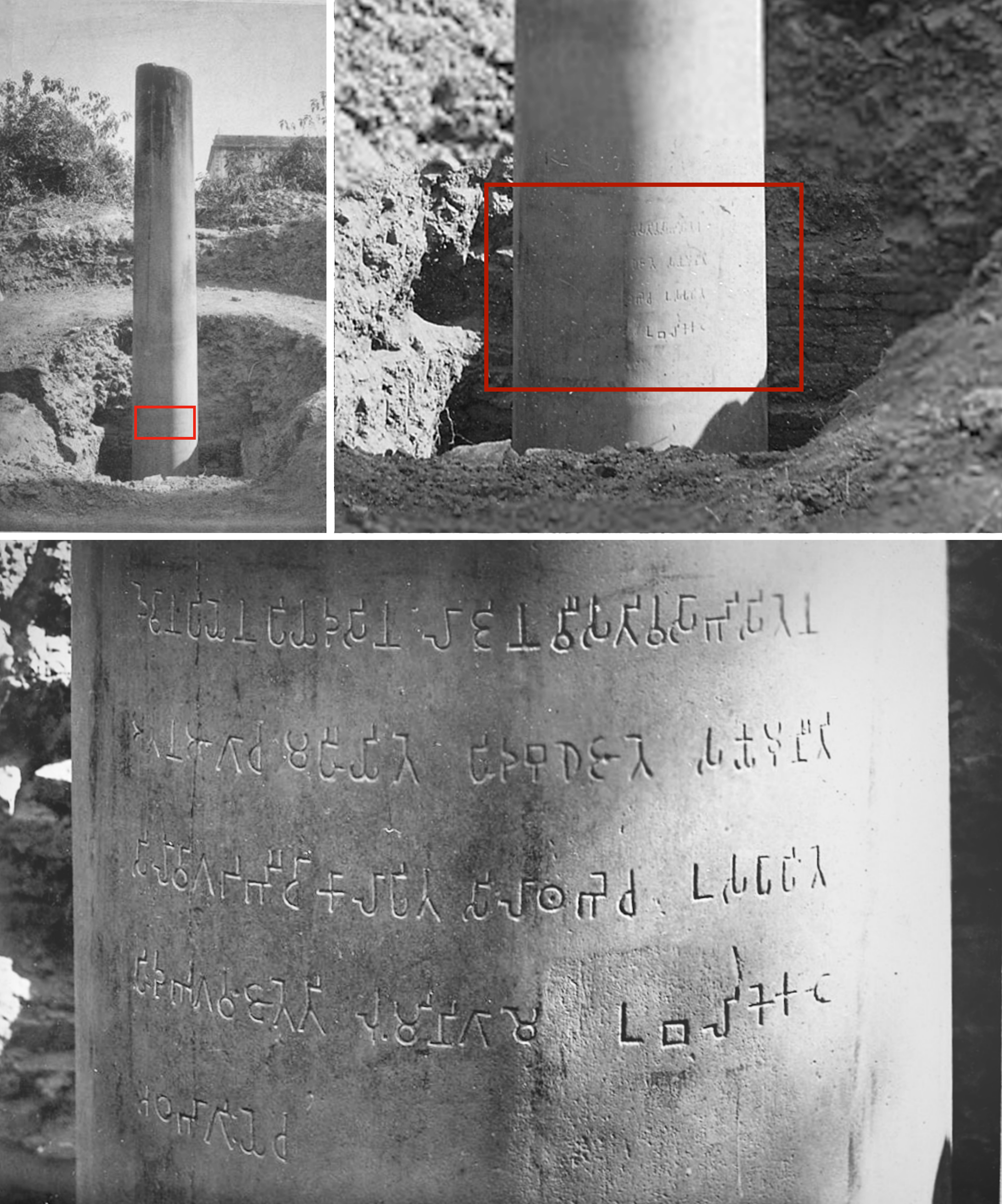
The Lumbini pillar contains an inscription stating that this is the Buddha's birthplace.

According to the Buddhist tradition, Gautama was born in Lumbini, now in modern-day Nepal, (Note: Based on stone inscriptions, there is also speculation that Lumbei, Kapileswar village, Odisha, at the east coast of India, was the site of ancient Lumbini.(Mahāpātra 1977Mohāpātra 2000, p. 114Tripathy 2014) Hartmann 1991, pp. 38–39 discusses the hypothesis and states, "The inscription has generally been considered spurious (...)" He quotes Sircar: "There can hardly be any doubt that the people responsible for the Kapilesvara inscription copied it from the said facsimile not much earlier than 1928.") and raised in Kapilavastu. (Note: Some sources mention Kapilavastu as the birthplace of the Buddha. Gethin states: "The earliest Buddhist sources state that the future Buddha was born Siddhārtha Gautama (Pali Siddhattha Gotama), the son of a local chieftain—a rājan—in Kapilavastu (Pali Kapilavatthu) what is now the Indian–Nepalese border." Gethin does not give references for this statement.) The exact site of ancient Kapilavastu is unknown. It may have been either Piprahwa, Uttar Pradesh, in present-day India, or Tilaurakot, in present-day Nepal. Both places belonged to the Sakya territory, and are located only 24 kilometres (15 mi) apart.

In the mid-3rd century BCE the Emperor Ashoka determined that Lumbini was Gautama's birthplace and thus installed a pillar there with the inscription: "...this is where the Buddha, sage of the Śākyas (Śākyamuni), was born."

According to later biographies such as the Mahavastu and the Lalitavistara, his mother, Maya, Suddhodana's wife, was a princess from Devdaha, the ancient capital of the Koliya Kingdom (what is now the Rupandehi District of Nepal). Legend has it that, on the night Siddhartha was conceived, Queen Maya dreamt that a white elephant with six white tusks entered her right side, and ten months later Siddhartha was born. As was the Shakya tradition, when his mother became pregnant, she left Kapilavastu for her father's kingdom to give birth.

Her son is said to have been born on the way, at Lumbini, in a garden beneath a sal tree. The earliest Buddhist sources state that the Buddha was born to an aristocratic Kshatriya (Pali: khattiya) family called Gautama (Pali: Gotama), who were part of the Shakyas, a tribe of rice-farmers living near the modern border of India and Nepal. (Note: According to Geoffrey Samuel, the Buddha was born into a Kshatriya clan, in a moderate Vedic culture at the central Ganges Plain area, where the shramana-traditions developed. This area had a moderate Vedic culture, where the Kshatriyas were the highest varna, in contrast to the Brahmanic ideology of Kuru–Panchala, where the Brahmins had become the highest varna. Both the Vedic culture and the shramana tradition contributed to the emergence of the so-called "Hindu-synthesis" around the start of the Common Era.) His father Śuddhodana was "an elected chief of the Shakya clan", whose capital was Kapilavastu, and who were later annexed by the growing Kingdom of Kosala during the Buddha's lifetime.

The early Buddhist texts contain very little information about the birth and youth of Gotama Buddha. Later biographies developed a dramatic narrative about the life of the young Gotama as a prince and his existential troubles. They depict his father Śuddhodana as a hereditary monarch of the Suryavansha (Solar dynasty) of Ikṣvāku (Pāli: Okkāka). This is unlikely, as many scholars think that Śuddhodana was merely a Shakya aristocrat (khattiya), and that the Shakya republic was not a hereditary monarchy. The more egalitarian gaṇasaṅgha form of government, as a political alternative to Indian monarchies, may have influenced the development of the śramanic Jain and Buddhist sanghas, (Note: See the Upaddha Sutta ("Half (of the Holy Life)") Thanissaro Bhikkhu (ytansl.), Sutta Central: "Admirable friendship, admirable companionship, admirable camaraderie is actually the whole of the holy life. When a monk has admirable people as friends, companions, & comrades, he can be expected to develop & pursue the noble eightfold path.") where monarchies tended toward Vedic Brahmanism.

The day of the Buddha's birth, enlightenment and death is widely celebrated in Theravada countries as Vesak and the day he was conceived as Poson. Buddha's Birthday is called Buddha Purnima in Nepal, Bangladesh, and India as he is believed to have been born on a full moon day.

According to later biographical legends, during the birth celebrations, the hermit seer Asita journeyed from his mountain abode, analysed the child for the "32 marks of a great man" and then announced that he would either become a great king (chakravartin) or a great religious leader. Suddhodana held a naming ceremony on the fifth day and invited eight Brahmin scholars to read the future. All gave similar predictions. Kaundinya, the youngest, and later to be the first arhat other than the Buddha, was reputed to be the only one who unequivocally predicted that Siddhartha would become a Buddha.

Early texts suggest that Gautama was not familiar with the dominant religious teachings of his time until he left on his religious quest, which is said to have been motivated by existential concern for the human condition. According to the early Buddhist Texts of several schools, and numerous post-canonical accounts, Gotama had a wife, Yasodhara, and a son, named Rāhula. Besides this, the Buddha in the early texts reports that "I lived a spoilt, a very spoilt life, monks (in my parents' home)."

The legendary biographies like the Lalitavistara also tell stories of young Gotama's great martial skill, which was put to the test in various contests against other Shakyan youths.

=== Renunciation ===
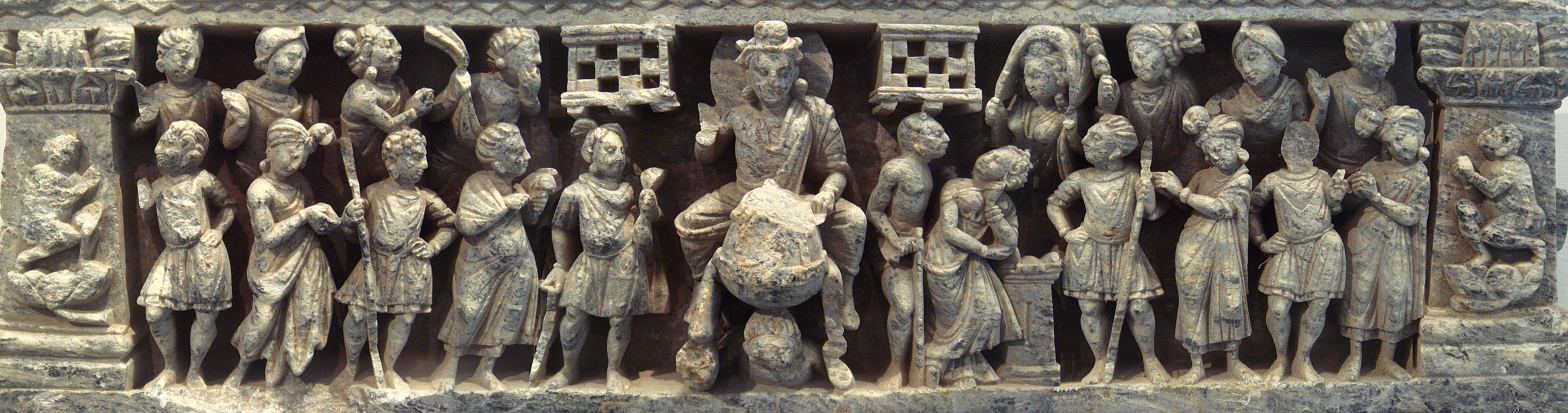
The "Great Departure" of Siddhartha Gautama, surrounded by a halo, he is accompanied by numerous guards and devata who have come to pay homage; Gandhara, Kushan period.

While the earliest sources merely depict Gotama seeking a higher spiritual goal and becoming an ascetic or śramaṇa after being disillusioned with lay life, the later legendary biographies tell a more elaborate dramatic story about how he became a mendicant.

The earliest accounts of the Buddha's spiritual quest is found in texts such as the Pali Ariyapariyesanā-sutta ("The discourse on the noble quest", MN 26) and its Chinese parallel at MĀ 204. These texts report that what led to Gautama's renunciation was the thought that his life was subject to old age, disease and death and that there might be something better. The early texts also depict the Buddha's explanation for becoming a sramana as follows: "The household life, this place of impurity, is narrow—the samana life is the free open air. It is not easy for a householder to lead the perfected, utterly pure and perfect holy life." MN 26, MĀ 204, the Dharmaguptaka Vinaya and the Mahāvastu all agree that his mother and father opposed his decision and "wept with tearful faces" when he decided to leave.

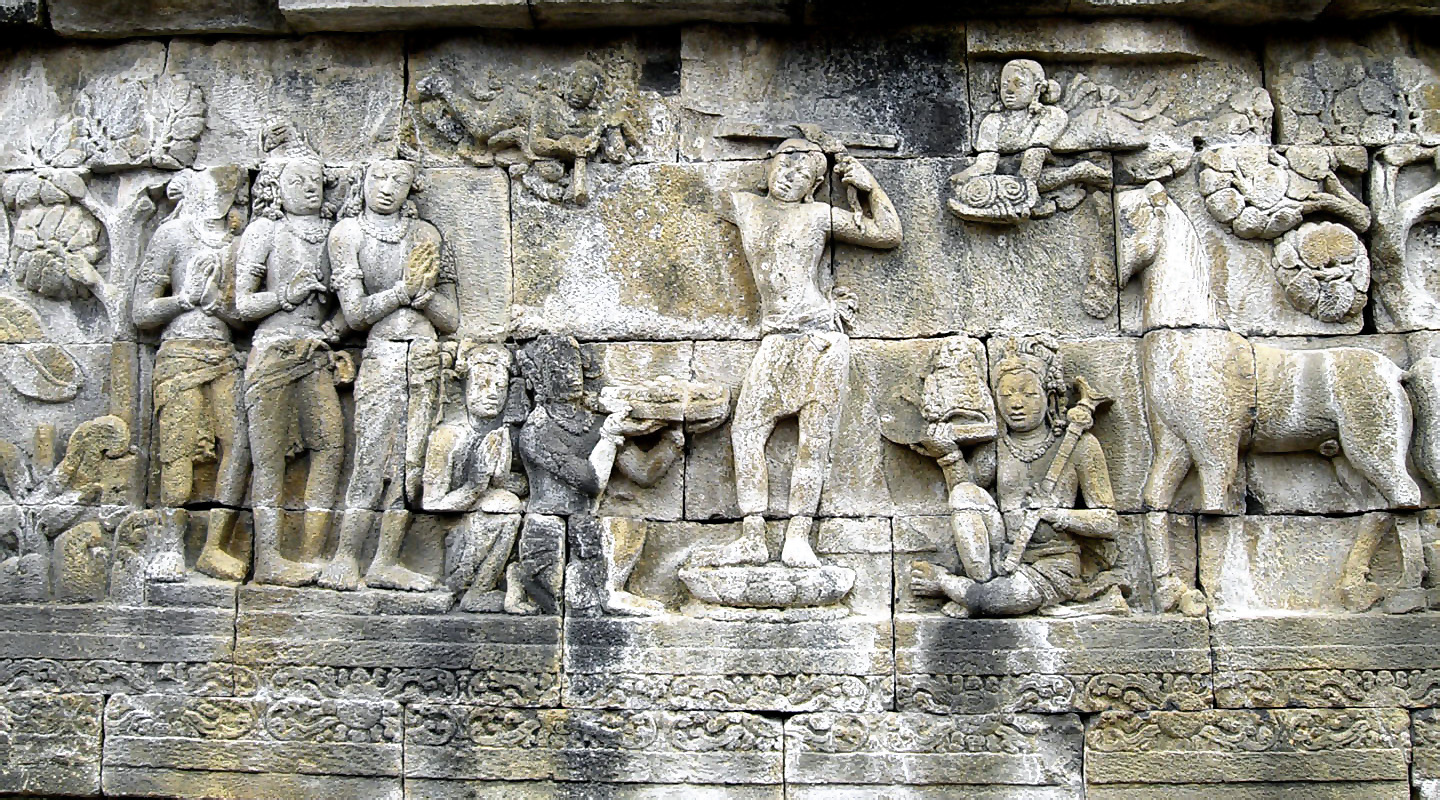
Prince Siddhartha shaves his hair and becomes a śramaṇa. Borobudur, 8th century

Legendary biographies also tell the story of how Gautama left his palace to see the outside world for the first time and how he was shocked by his encounter with human suffering. These depict Gautama's father as shielding him from religious teachings and from knowledge of human suffering, so that he would become a great king instead of a great religious leader. In the Nidanakatha (5th century CE), Gautama is said to have seen an old man. When his charioteer Chandaka explained to him that all people grew old, the prince went on further trips beyond the palace. On these he encountered a diseased man, a decaying corpse, and an ascetic that inspired him. This story of the "four sights" seems to be adapted from an earlier account in the Digha Nikaya (DN 14.2) which instead depicts the young life of a previous Buddha, Vipassi.

The legendary biographies depict Gautama's departure from his palace as follows. Shortly after seeing the four sights, Gautama woke up at night and saw his female servants lying in unattractive, corpse-like poses, which shocked him. Therefore, he discovered what he would later understand more deeply during his enlightenment: dukkha ("standing unstable", "dissatisfaction") and the end of dukkha. Moved by all the things he had experienced, he decided to leave the palace in the middle of the night against the will of his father, to live the life of a wandering ascetic.

Accompanied by Chandaka and riding his horse Kanthaka, Gautama leaves the palace, leaving behind his son Rahula and Yaśodhara. He travelled to the river Anomiya, and cut off his hair. Leaving his servant and horse behind, he journeyed into the woods and changed into monk's robes there, though in some other versions of the story, he received the robes from a Brahma deity at Anomiya.

According to the legendary biographies, when the ascetic Gautama first went to Rajagaha (present-day Rajgir) to beg for alms in the streets, King Bimbisara of Magadha learned of his quest, and offered him a share of his kingdom. Gautama rejected the offer but promised to visit his kingdom first, upon attaining enlightenment.

=== Ascetic life and awakening ===
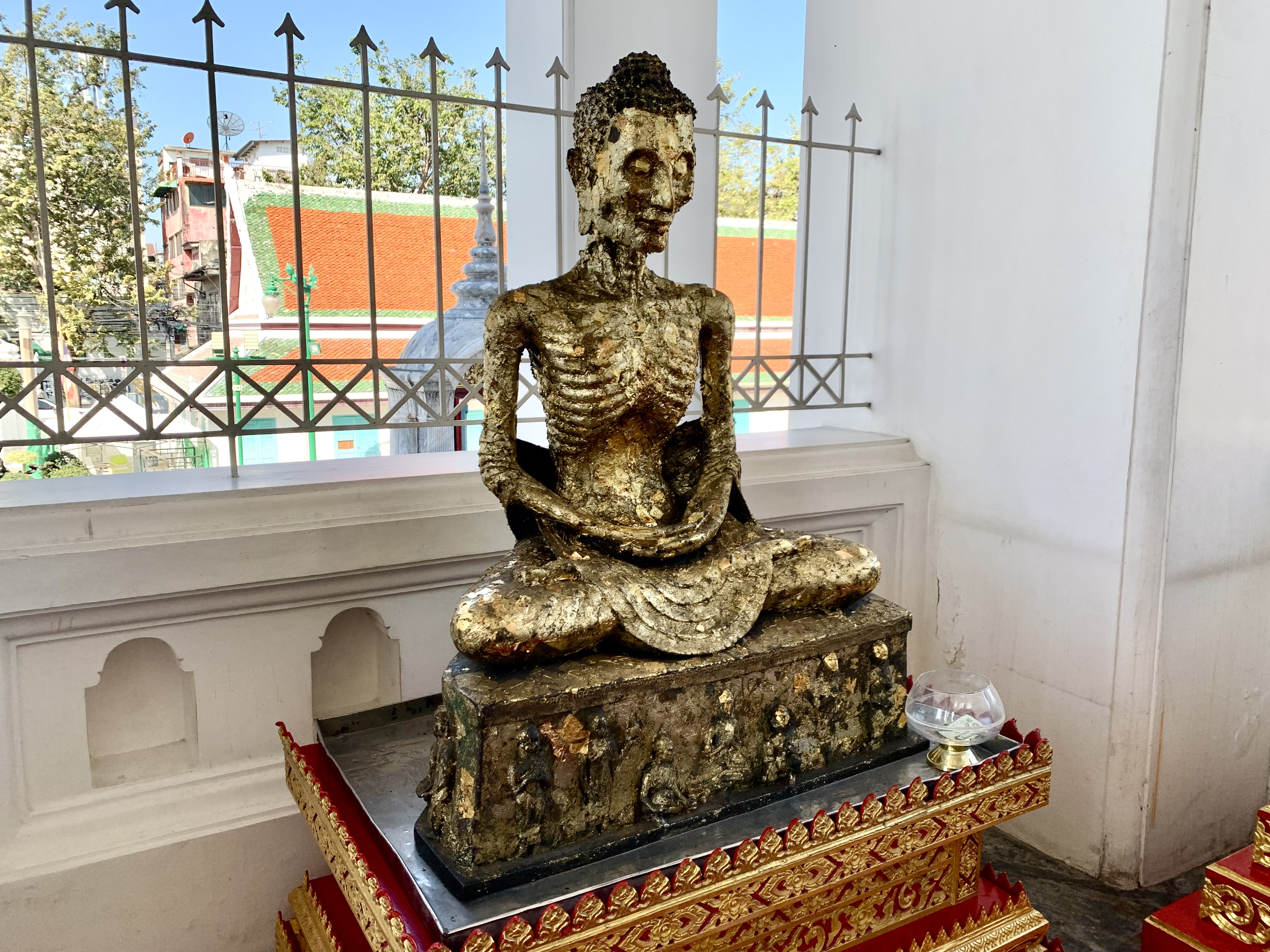
The gilded "Emaciated Buddha statue" in Wat Suthat in Bangkok representing the stage of his asceticism

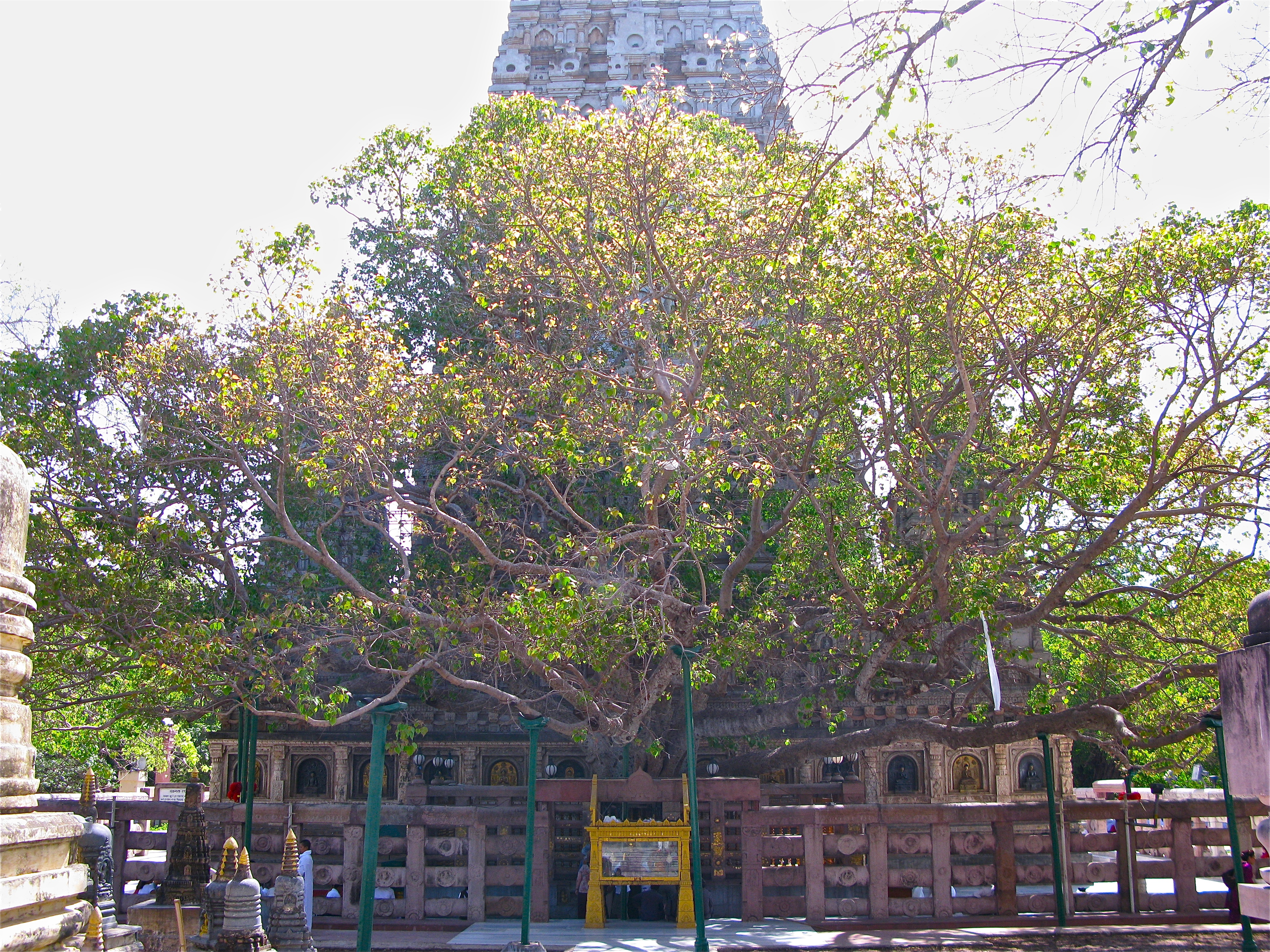
The Mahabodhi Tree at the Mahabodhi Temple in Bodh Gaya

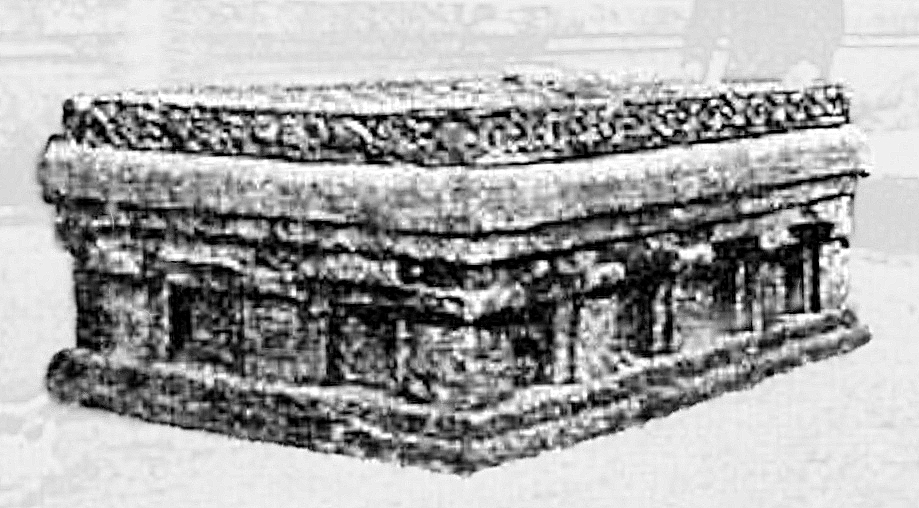
The Enlightenment Throne of the Buddha at Bodh Gaya, as recreated by Emperor Ashoka in the 3rd century BCE

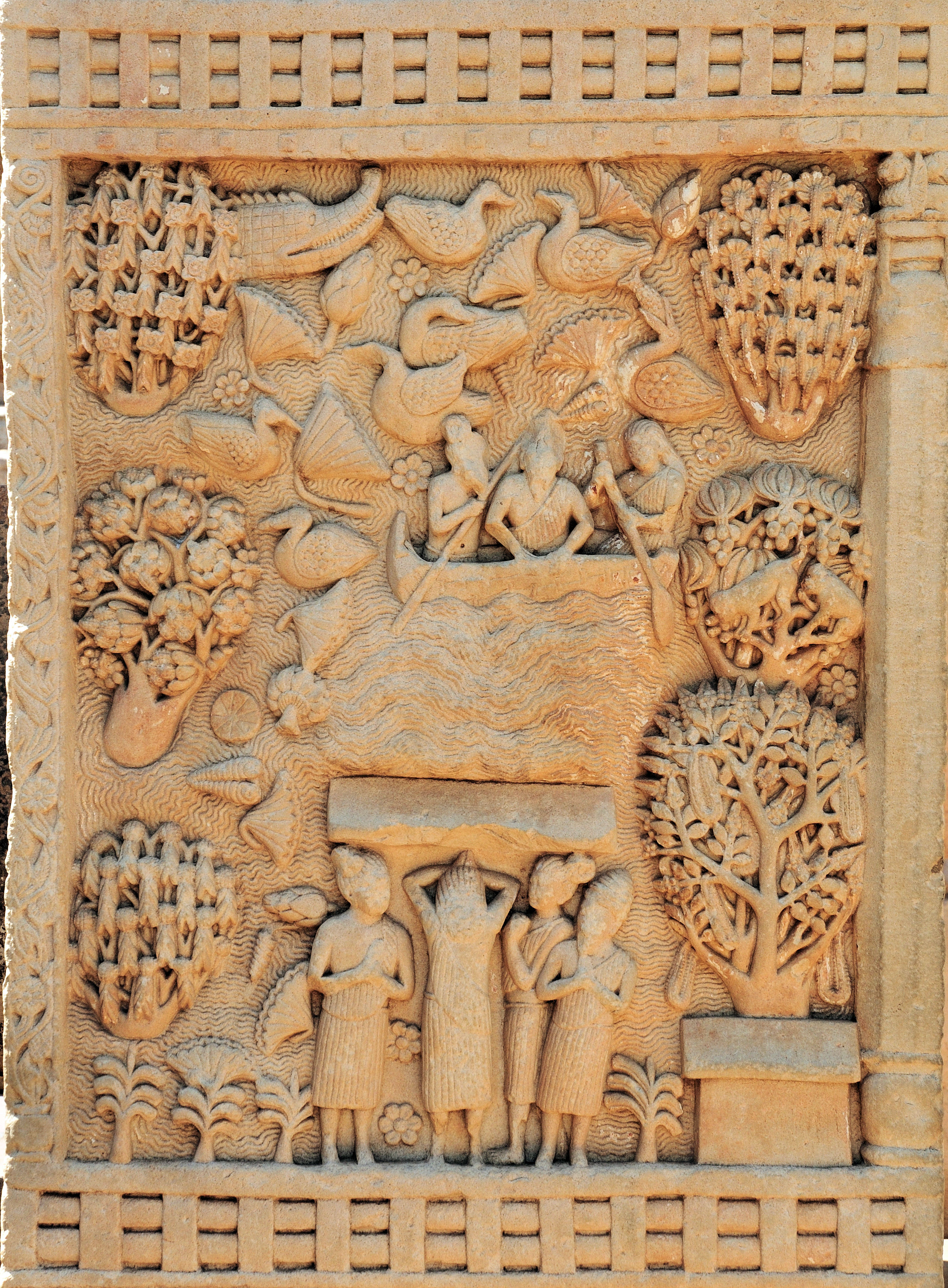
Miracle of the Buddha walking on the River Nairañjanā. The Buddha is not visible (aniconism), only represented by a path on the water, and his empty throne bottom right. Sanchi.

Majjhima Nikaya 4 mentions that Gautama lived in "remote jungle thickets" during his years of spiritual striving and had to overcome the fear that he felt while living in the forests. The Nikaya-texts narrate that the ascetic Gautama practised under two teachers of Vedic-Brahmanic meditation. According to the Ariyapariyesanā-sutta (MN 26) and its Chinese parallel at MĀ 204, after having mastered the teaching of Ārāḍa Kālāma (Pali: Alara Kalama), who taught a meditation attainment called "the sphere of nothingness", he was asked by Ārāḍa to become an equal leader of their spiritual community.

Gautama felt unsatisfied by the practice because it "does not lead to revulsion, to dispassion, to cessation, to calm, to knowledge, to awakening, to Nibbana", and moved on to become a student of Udraka Rāmaputra (Pali: Udaka Ramaputta). With him, he achieved high levels of meditative consciousness (called "The Sphere of Neither Perception nor Non-Perception") and was again asked to join his teacher. But, once more, he was not satisfied for the same reasons as before, and moved on.

According to some sutras, after leaving his meditation teachers, Gotama then practiced ascetic techniques. (Note: An account of these practices can be seen in the Mahāsaccaka-sutta (MN 36) and its various parallels (which according to Anālayo include some Sanskrit fragments, an individual Chinese translation, a sutra of the Ekottarika-āgama as well as sections of the Lalitavistara and the Mahāvastu).) The ascetic techniques described in the early texts include very minimal food intake, different forms of breath control, and forceful mind control. The texts report that he became so emaciated that his bones became visible through his skin. The Mahāsaccaka-sutta and most of its parallels agree that after taking asceticism to its extremes, Gautama realised that this had not helped him attain nirvana, and that he needed to regain strength to pursue his goal. One popular story tells of how he accepted milk and rice pudding from a village girl named Sujata.

According to the 身毛喜豎經, (Note: a Chinese translation of Mahāsīhanāda-sutta.) his break with asceticism led his five companions to abandon him, since they believed that he had abandoned his search and become undisciplined. At this point, Gautama remembered a previous experience of dhyana ("meditation") he had as a child sitting under a tree while his father worked. This memory leads him to understand that dhyana is the path to liberation, and the texts then depict the Buddha achieving all four dhyanas, followed by the "three higher knowledges" (tevijja), (Note: According to various early texts like the Mahāsaccaka-sutta, and the Samaññaphala Sutta, a Buddha has achieved three higher knowledges: Remembering one's former abodes (i.e. past lives), the "Divine eye" (dibba-cakkhu), which allows the knowing of others' karmic destinations and the "extinction of mental intoxicants" (āsavakkhaya).) culminating in complete insight into the Four Noble Truths, thereby attaining liberation from samsara, the endless cycle of rebirth. (Note: Scholars have noted inconsistencies in the presentations of the Buddha's enlightenment, and the Buddhist path to liberation, in the oldest sutras. These inconsistencies show that the Buddhist teachings evolved, either during the lifetime of the Buddha, or thereafter. See: * Bareau (1963) * Schmithausen (1981) * Norman (2003) * Vetter (1988) * Gombrich (2006a), Chapter 4 * Bronkhorst (1993), Chapter 7 * Anderson (1999))

According to the Dhammacakkappavattana Sutta (SN 56), the Tathagata, the term Gautama uses most often to refer to himself, realised "the Middle Way"—a path of moderation away from the extremes of self-indulgence and self-mortification, or the Noble Eightfold Path. In later centuries, Gautama became known as the Buddha or "Awakened One". The title indicates that unlike most people who are "asleep", a Buddha is understood as having "woken up" to the true nature of reality and sees the world 'as it is' (yatha-bhutam). A Buddha has achieved liberation (vimutti), also called Nirvana, which is seen as the extinguishing of the "fires" of desire, hatred, and ignorance, that keep the cycle of suffering and rebirth going.

Following his decision to leave his meditation teachers, MĀ 204 and other parallel early texts report that Gautama sat down with the determination not to get up until full awakening (sammā-sambodhi) had been reached; the Ariyapariyesanā-sutta does not mention "full awakening", but only that he attained nirvana. In Buddhist tradition, this event was said to have occurred under a pipal tree—known as "the Bodhi tree"—in Bodh Gaya, Bihar.

As reported by various texts from the Pali Canon, the Buddha sat for seven days under the Bodhi tree "feeling the bliss of deliverance". The Pali texts also report that he continued to meditate and contemplated various aspects of the Dharma while living by the River Nairañjanā, such as Dependent Origination, the Five Spiritual Faculties and suffering (dukkha).

The legendary biographies like the Mahavastu, Nidanakatha and the Lalitavistara depict an attempt by Mara, the ruler of the desire realm, to prevent the Buddha's nirvana. He does so by sending his daughters to seduce the Buddha, by asserting his superiority and by assaulting him with armies of monsters. However the Buddha is unfazed and calls on the earth (or in some versions of the legend, the earth goddess) as witness to his superiority by touching the ground before entering meditation. Other miracles and magical events are also depicted.

=== First sermon and formation of the saṅgha ===
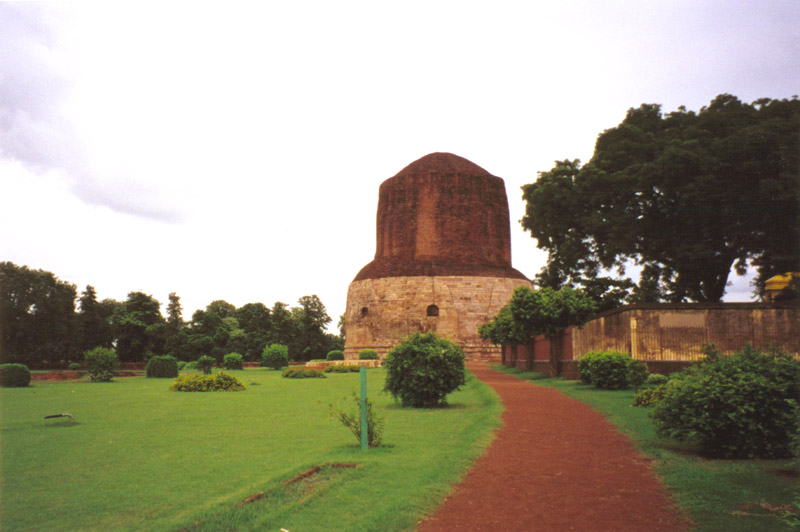
Dhamek Stupa in Sarnath, India, site of the first teaching of the Buddha in which he taught the Four Noble Truths to his first five disciples

According to MN 26, immediately after his awakening, the Buddha hesitated on whether or not he should teach the Dharma to others. He was concerned that humans were overpowered by ignorance, greed, and hatred that it would be difficult for them to recognise the path, which is "subtle, deep and hard to grasp". However, the god Brahmā Sahampati convinced him, arguing that at least some "with little dust in their eyes" will understand it. The Buddha relented and agreed to teach. According to Anālayo, the Chinese parallel to MN 26, MĀ 204, does not contain this story, but this event does appear in other parallel texts, such as in an Ekottarika-āgama discourse, in the Catusparisat-sūtra, and in the Lalitavistara.

According to MN 26 and MĀ 204, after deciding to teach, the Buddha initially intended to visit his former teachers, Alara Kalama and Udaka Ramaputta, to teach them his insights, but they had already died, so he decided to visit his five former companions. MN 26 and MĀ 204 both report that on his way to Vārānasī (Benares), he met another wanderer, an Ājīvika ascetic named Upaka in MN 26. The Buddha proclaimed that he had achieved full awakening, but Upaka was not convinced and "took a different path".

MN 26 and MĀ 204 continue with the Buddha reaching the Deer Park (Sarnath) (Mrigadāva, also called Rishipatana, "site where the ashes of the ascetics fell") near Vārānasī, where he met the group of five ascetics and was able to convince them that he had indeed reached full awakening. According to MĀ 204 (but not MN 26), as well as the Theravāda Vinaya, an Ekottarika-āgama text, the Dharmaguptaka Vinaya, the Mahīśāsaka Vinaya, and the Mahāvastu, the Buddha then taught them the "first sermon", also known as the "Benares sermon", i.e., the teaching of "the noble eightfold path as the middle path aloof from the two extremes of sensual indulgence and self-mortification". The Pali text reports that after the first sermon, the ascetic Kaundinya became the first arhat (liberated being) and the first Buddhist bhikkhu or monastic. The Buddha then continued to teach the other ascetics and they formed the first saṅgha, the company of Buddhist monks.

Various sources such as the Mahāvastu, the Mahākhandhaka of the Theravāda Vinaya and the Catusparisat-sūtra also mention that the Buddha taught them his second discourse, about the characteristic of "not-self" (Anātmalakṣaṇa Sūtra), at this time or five days later. After hearing this second sermon the four remaining ascetics also reached the status of arahant.

The Theravāda Vinaya and the Catusparisat-sūtra also speak of the conversion of Yasa, a local guild master, and his friends and family, who were some of the first laypersons to be converted and to enter the Buddhist community. The conversion of three brothers named Kassapa followed, who brought with them five hundred converts who had previously been "matted hair ascetics", and whose spiritual practice was related to fire sacrifices. According to the Theravāda Vinaya, the Buddha then stopped at the Gayasisa hill near Gaya and delivered his third discourse, the Ādittapariyāya Sutta (The Discourse on Fire), in which he taught that everything in the world is inflamed by passions and only those who follow the Eightfold path can be liberated.

At the end of the rainy season, when the Buddha's community had grown to around sixty awakened monks, he instructed them to wander on their own, teach and ordain people into the community, for the "welfare and benefit" of the world.

=== Travels and growth of the saṅgha ===
Kosala and Magadha in the post-Vedic period

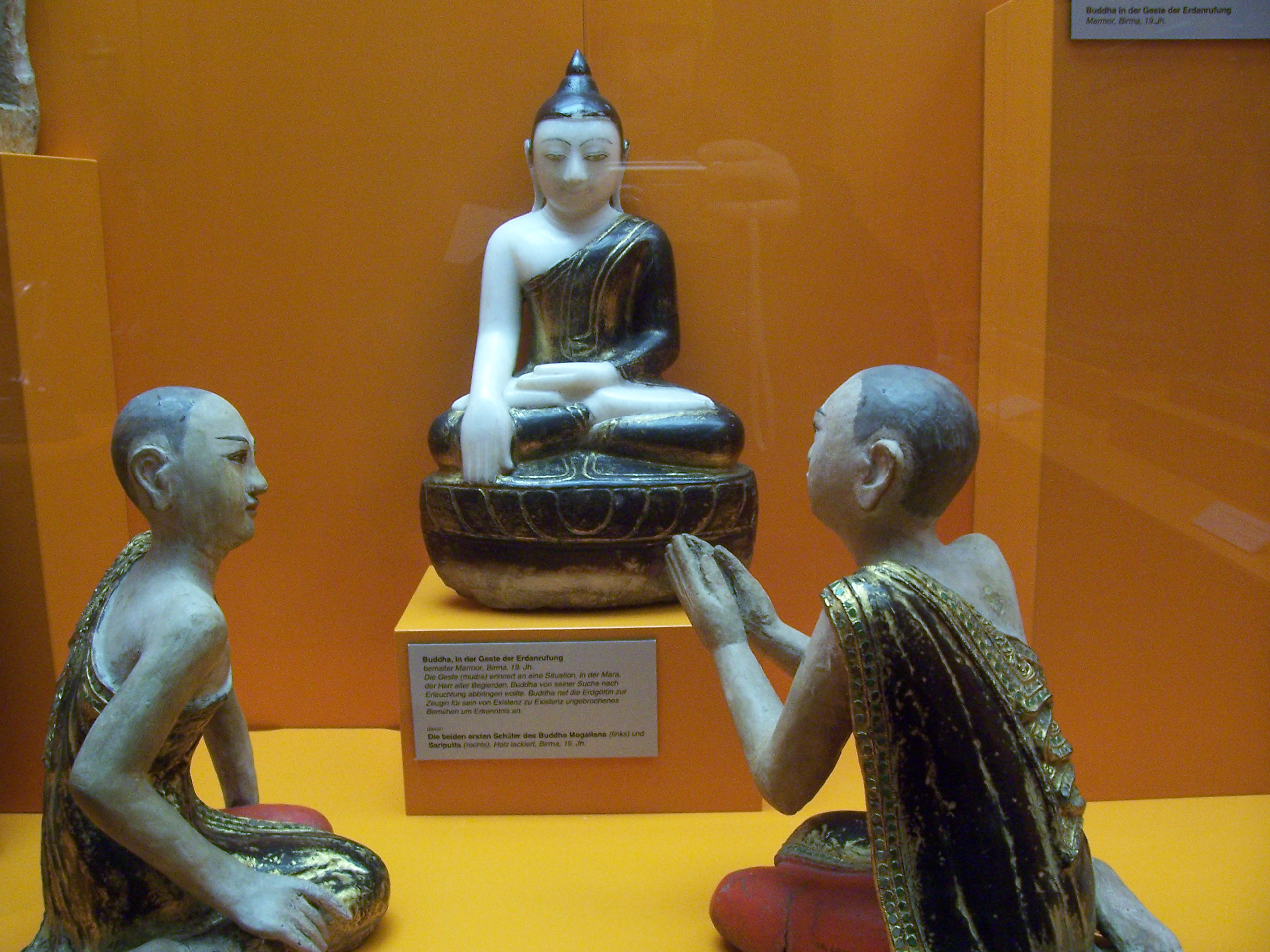
The chief disciples of the Buddha, Mogallana (chief in psychic power) and Sariputta (chief in wisdom)

For the remaining 40 or 45 years of his life, the Buddha is said to have travelled in the Gangetic Plain, in what is now Uttar Pradesh, Bihar, and southern Nepal, teaching a diverse range of people: from nobles to servants, ascetics and householders, murderers such as Angulimala, and cannibals such as Alavaka. According to Schumann, the Buddha's travels ranged from "Kosambi on the Yamuna (25 km south-west of Allahabad)", to Campa (40 km east of Bhagalpur)" and from "Kapilavatthu (95 km north-west of Gorakhpur) to Uruvela (south of Gaya)". This covers an area of 600 by 300 km. His sangha enjoyed the patronage of the kings of Kosala and Magadha and he thus spent a lot of time in their respective capitals, Savatthi and Rajagaha.

According to the Theravada view, the Buddha spoke the language of Magadha or the speech that was current in the Magadha region.

The sangha wandered throughout the year, except during the four months of the Vassa rainy season when ascetics of all religions rarely travelled. One reason was that it was more difficult to do so without causing harm to flora and animal life. The health of the ascetics might have been a concern as well. At this time of year, the sangha would retreat to monasteries, public parks or forests, where people would come to them.

The first vassana was spent at Varanasi when the sangha was formed. According to the Pali texts, shortly after the formation of the sangha, the Buddha travelled to Rajagaha, capital of Magadha, and met with King Bimbisara, who gifted a bamboo grove park to the sangha.

The Buddha's sangha continued to grow during his initial travels in north India. The early texts tell the story of how the Buddha's chief disciples, Sāriputta and Mahāmoggallāna, who were both students of the sceptic sramana Sañjaya Belaṭṭhiputta, were converted by Assaji. They also tell of how the Buddha's son, Rahula, joined his father as a bhikkhu when the Buddha visited his old home, Kapilavastu. Over time, other Shakyans joined the order as bhikkhus, such as Buddha's cousin Ānanda, Anuruddha, Upāli the barber, the Buddha's half-brother Nanda and Devadatta. Meanwhile, the Buddha's father Suddhodana heard his son's teaching, converted to Buddhism and became a stream-enterer.

The early texts also mention an important lay disciple, the merchant Anāthapiṇḍika, who became a strong lay supporter of the Buddha early on. He is said to have gifted Jeta's grove (Jetavana) to the sangha at great expense (the Theravada Vinaya speaks of thousands of gold coins).

=== Formation of the bhikkhunī order ===
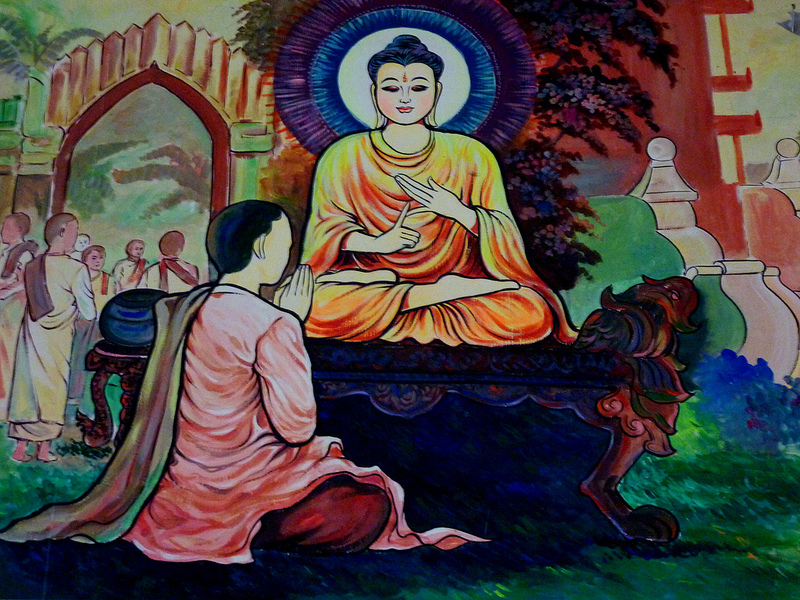
Mahāprajāpatī, the first bhikkuni and Buddha's stepmother, ordains

The formation of a parallel order of female monastics (bhikkhunī) was another important part of the growth of the Buddha's community. As noted by Anālayo's comparative study of this topic, there are various versions of this event depicted in the different early Buddhist texts. (Note: Anālayo draws from seven early sources: 1. the Dharmaguptaka Vinaya in Four Parts, preserved in Chinese; 2. a *Vinayamātṛkā preserved in Chinese translation, which some scholars suggest represents the Haimavata tradition; 3. the Mahāsāṃghika-Lokottaravāda Vinaya, preserved in Sanskrit; 4. the Mahīśāsaka Vinaya in Five Parts, preserved in Chinese; 5. the Mūlasarvāstivāda Vinaya, where the episode is extant in Chinese and Tibetan translation, with considerable parts also preserved in Sanskrit fragments; 6. a discourse in the Madhyama-āgama, preserved in Chinese, probably representing the Sarvāstivāda tradition; 7. a Pāli discourse found among the Eights of the Aṅguttara-nikāya; the same account is also found in the Theravāda Vinaya preserved in Pāli)

According to all the major versions surveyed by Anālayo, Mahāprajāpatī Gautamī, Buddha's step-mother, is initially turned down by the Buddha after requesting ordination for her and some other women. Mahāprajāpatī and her followers then shave their hair, don robes and begin following the Buddha on his travels. The Buddha is eventually convinced by Ānanda to grant ordination to Mahāprajāpatī on her acceptance of eight conditions called gurudharmas which focus on the relationship between the new order of nuns and the monks.

According to Anālayo, the only argument common to all the versions that Ananda uses to convince the Buddha is that women have the same ability to reach all stages of awakening. Anālayo also notes that some modern scholars have questioned the authenticity of the eight gurudharmas in their present form due to various inconsistencies. He holds that the historicity of the current lists of eight is doubtful, but that they may have been based on earlier injunctions by the Buddha.

Anālayo notes that various passages indicate that the reason for the Buddha's hesitation to ordain women was the danger that the life of a wandering sramana posed for women that were not under the protection of their male family members, such as dangers of sexual assault and abduction. Due to this, the gurudharma injunctions may have been a way to place "the newly founded order of nuns in a relationship to its male counterparts that resembles as much as possible the protection a laywoman could expect from her male relatives".

=== Later years ===
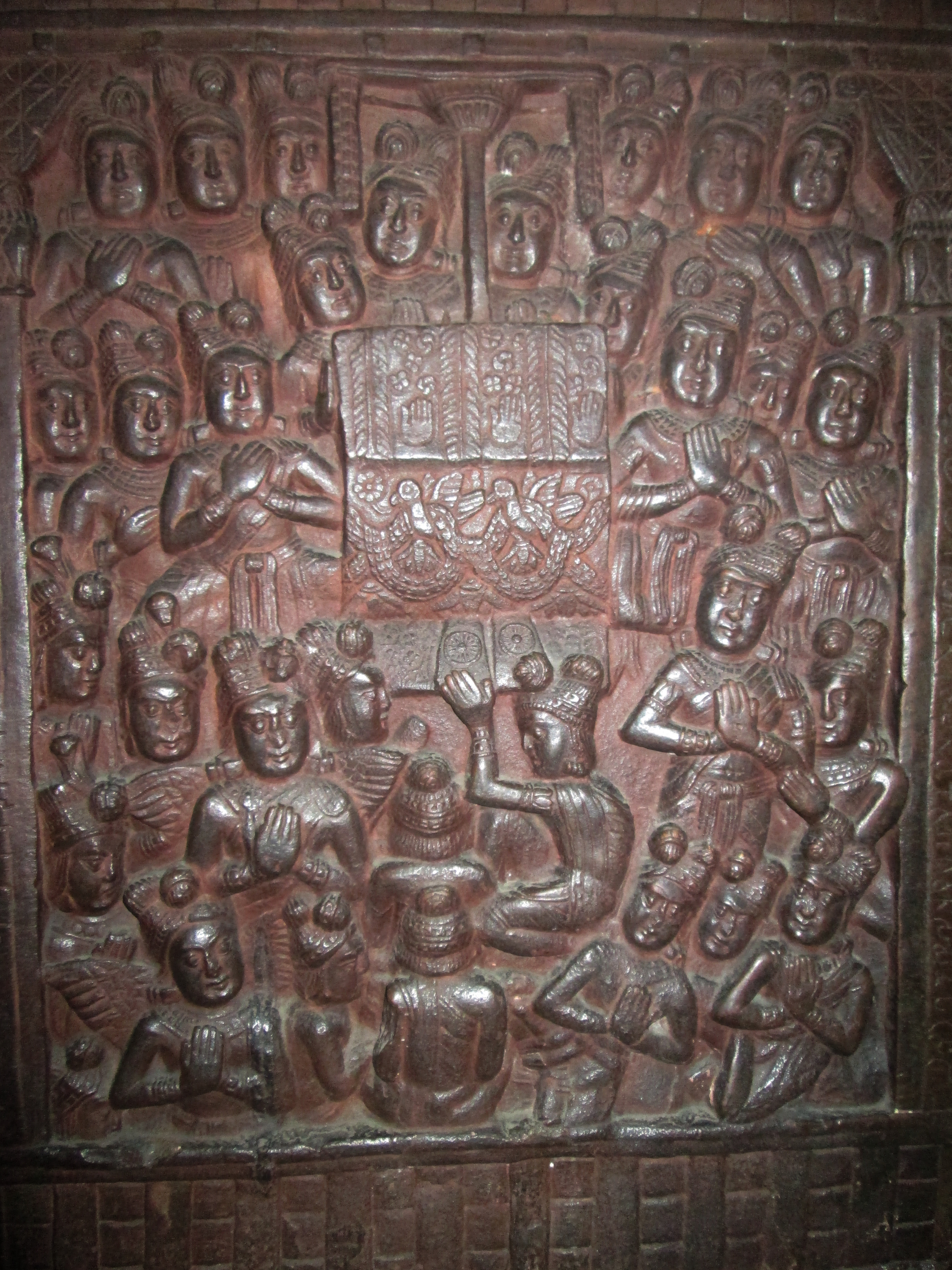
Ajatashatru worships the Buddha, relief from the Bharhut Stupa at the Indian Museum, Kolkata

According to J.S. Strong, after the first 20 years of his teaching career, the Buddha seems to have slowly settled in Sravasti, the capital of the Kingdom of Kosala, spending most of his later years in this city.

As the sangha grew in size, the need for a standardised set of monastic rules arose and the Buddha seems to have developed a set of regulations for the sangha. These are preserved in various texts called "Pratimoksa" which were recited by the community every fortnight. The Pratimoksa includes general ethical precepts, as well as rules regarding the essentials of monastic life, such as bowls and robes.

In his later years, the Buddha's fame grew and he was invited to important royal events, such as the inauguration of the new council hall of the Shakyans (as seen in MN 53) and the inauguration of a new palace by Prince Bodhi (as depicted in MN 85). The early texts also speak of how during the Buddha's old age, the kingdom of Magadha was usurped by a new king, Ajatashatru, who overthrew his father Bimbisara. According to the Samaññaphala Sutta, the new king spoke with different ascetic teachers and eventually took refuge in the Buddha. However, Jain sources also claim his allegiance, and it is likely he supported various religious groups, not just the Buddha's sangha exclusively.

As the Buddha continued to travel and teach, he also came into contact with members of other śrāmana sects. There is evidence from the early texts that the Buddha encountered some of these figures and critiqued their doctrines. The Samaññaphala Sutta identifies six such sects.

The early texts also depict the elderly Buddha as suffering from back pain. Several texts depict him delegating teachings to his chief disciples since his body now needed more rest. However, the Buddha continued teaching well into his old age.

One of the most troubling events during the Buddha's old age was Devadatta's schism. Early sources speak of how the Buddha's cousin, Devadatta, attempted to take over leadership of the order and then left the sangha with several Buddhist monks and formed a rival sect. This sect is said to have been supported by King Ajatashatru. The Pali texts depict Devadatta as plotting to kill the Buddha, but these plans all fail. They depict the Buddha as sending his two chief disciples (Sariputta and Moggallana) to this schismatic community in order to convince the monks who left with Devadatta to return.

All the major early Buddhist Vinaya texts depict Devadatta as a divisive figure who attempted to split the Buddhist community, but they disagree on what issues he disagreed with the Buddha on. The Sthavira texts generally focus on "five points" which are seen as excessive ascetic practices, while the Mahāsaṅghika Vinaya speaks of a more comprehensive disagreement, which has Devadatta alter the discourses as well as monastic discipline.

At around the same time of Devadatta's schism, there was also war between Ajatashatru's Kingdom of Magadha, and Kosala, led by an elderly king Pasenadi. Ajatashatru seems to have been victorious, a turn of events the Buddha is reported to have regretted.

=== Last days and parinirvana ===
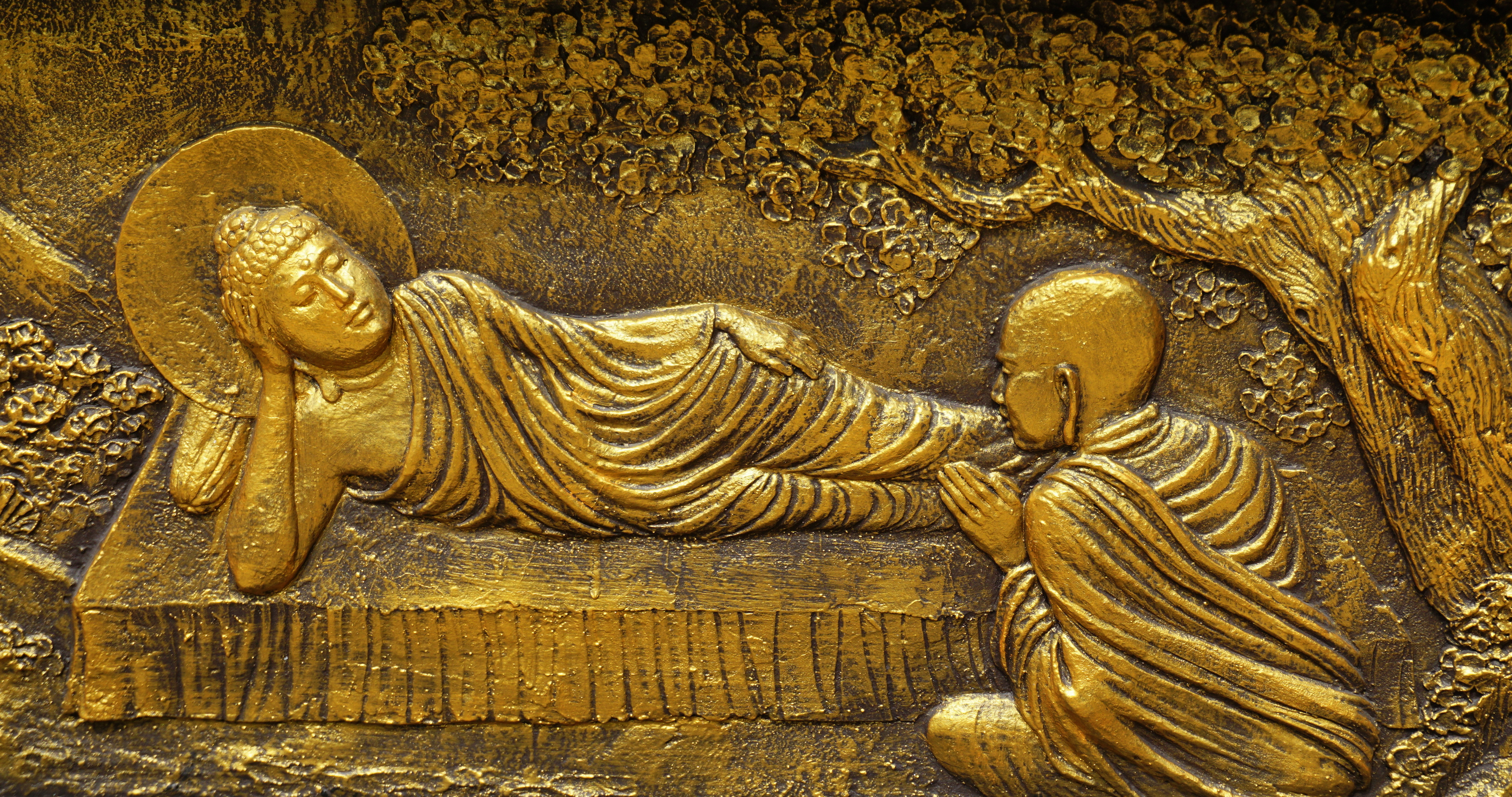
This East Javanese relief depicts the Buddha in his final days, and Ānanda, his chief attendant.

The main narrative of the Buddha's last days, death and the events following his death is contained in the Mahaparinibbana Sutta (DN 16) and its various parallels in Sanskrit, Chinese, and Tibetan. According to Anālayo, these include the Chinese Dirgha Agama 2, "Sanskrit fragments of the Mahaparinirvanasutra", and "three discourses preserved as individual translations in Chinese".

The Mahaparinibbana sutta depicts the Buddha's last year as a time of war. It begins with Ajatashatru's decision to make war on the Vajjika League, leading him to send a minister to ask the Buddha for advice. The Buddha responds by saying that the Vajjikas can be expected to prosper as long as they do seven things, and he then applies these seven principles to the Buddhist Sangha, showing that he is concerned about its future welfare.

The Buddha says that the Sangha will prosper as long as they "hold regular and frequent assemblies, meet in harmony, do not change the rules of training, honour their superiors who were ordained before them, do not fall prey to worldly desires, remain devoted to forest hermitages, and preserve their personal mindfulness". He then gives further lists of important virtues to be upheld by the Sangha.

The early texts depict how the Buddha's two chief disciples, Sariputta and Moggallana, died just before the Buddha's death. The Mahaparinibbana depicts the Buddha as experiencing illness during the last months of his life but initially recovering. It depicts him as stating that he cannot promote anyone to be his successor. When Ānanda requested this, the Mahaparinibbana records his response as follows:

Ananda, why does the Order of monks expect this of me? I have taught the Dhamma, making no distinction of "inner" and " outer": the Tathagata has no "teacher's fist" (in which certain truths are held back). If there is anyone who thinks: "I shall take charge of the Order", or "the Order is under my leadership", such a person would have to make arrangements about the Order. The Tathagata does not think in such terms. Why should the Tathagata make arrangements for the Order? I am now old, worn out...I have reached the term of life, I am turning eighty years of age. Just as an old cart is made to go by being held together with straps, so the Tathagata's body is kept going by being bandaged up...Therefore, Ananda, you should live as islands unto yourselves, being your own refuge, seeking no other refuge; with the Dhamma as an island, with the Dhamma as your refuge, seeking no other refuge... Those monks who in my time or afterwards live thus, seeking an island and a refuge in themselves and in the Dhamma and nowhere else, these zealous ones are truly my monks and will overcome the darkness (of rebirth).

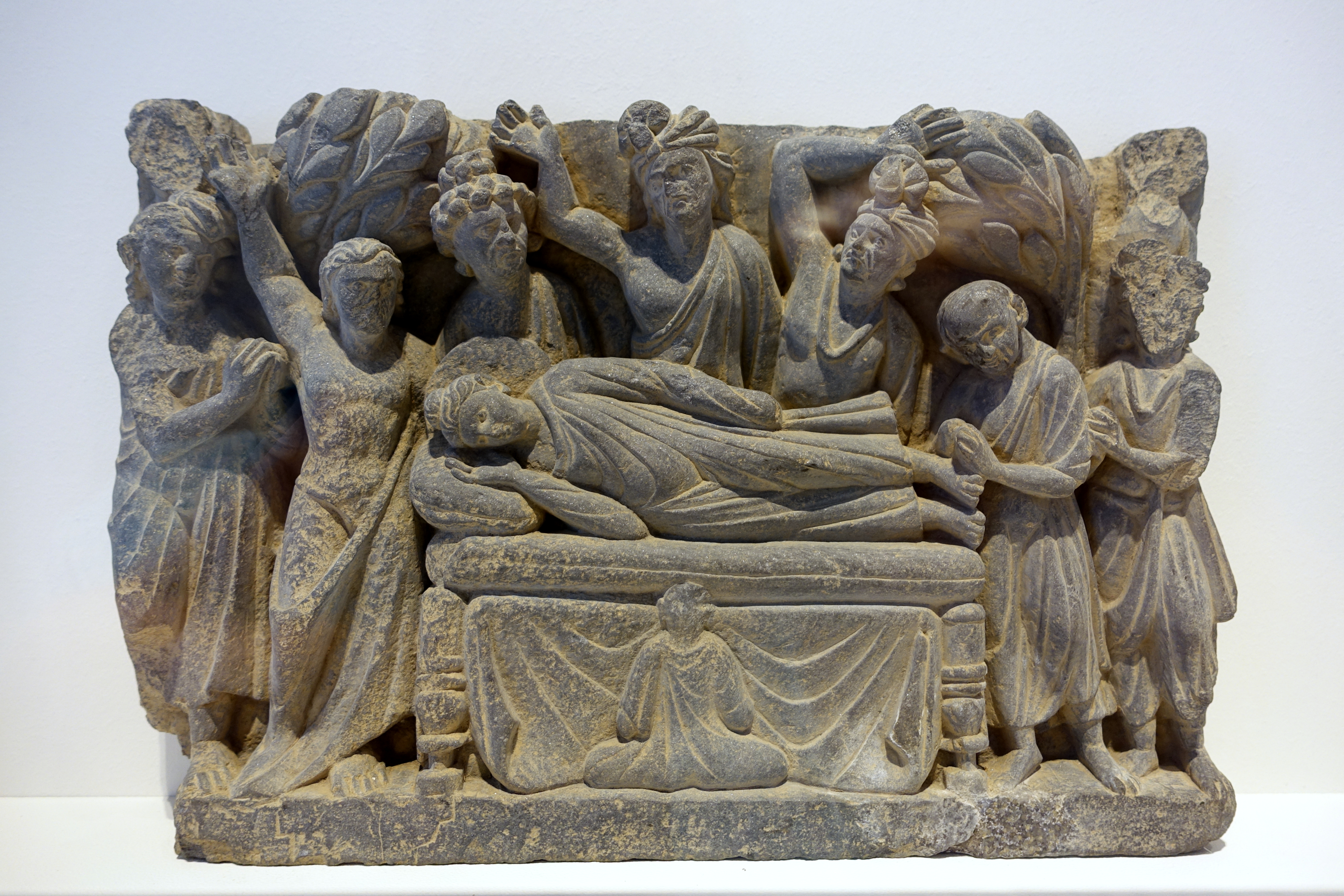
Mahaparinirvana, Gandhara, 3rd or 4th century CE, gray schist

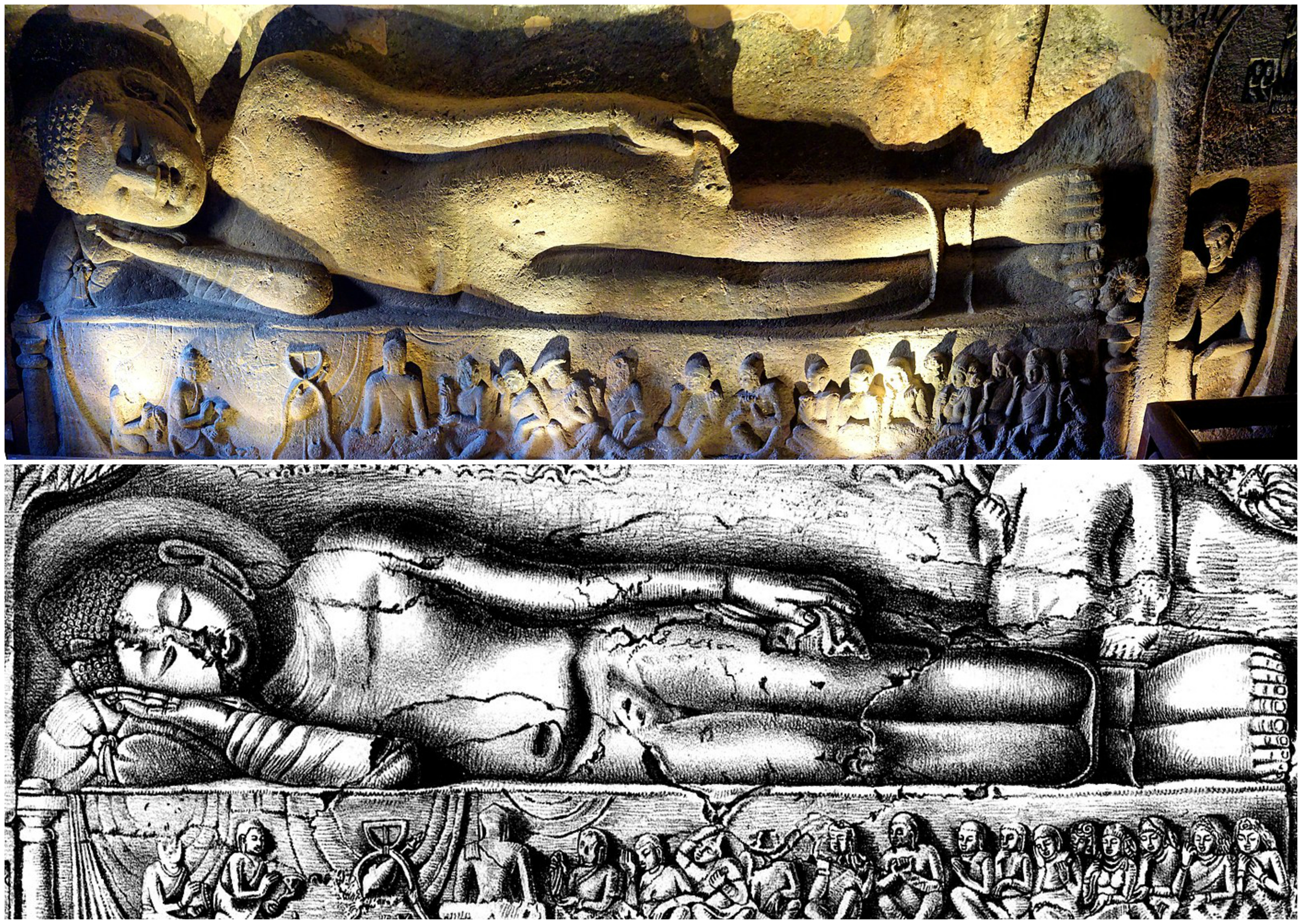
Mahaparinibbana scene, from the Ajanta Caves

After travelling and teaching some more, the Buddha ate his last meal, which he had received as an offering from a blacksmith named Cunda. Falling violently ill, Buddha instructed his attendant Ānanda to convince Cunda that the meal eaten at his place had nothing to do with his death and that his meal would be a source of the greatest merit as it provided the last meal for a Buddha. Bhikkhu Mettanando and Oskar von Hinüber argue that the Buddha died of mesenteric infarction, a symptom of old age, rather than food poisoning.

The precise contents of the Buddha's final meal are not clear, due to variant scriptural traditions and ambiguity over the translation of certain significant terms. The Theravada tradition generally believes that the Buddha was offered some kind of pork, while the Mahayana tradition believes that the Buddha consumed some sort of truffle or other mushroom. These may reflect the different traditional views on Buddhist vegetarianism and the precepts for monks and nuns. Modern scholars also disagree on this topic, arguing both for pig's flesh or some kind of plant or mushroom that pigs like to eat. (Note: Waley notes: suukara-kanda, "pig-bulb"; suukara-paadika, "pig's foot" and sukaresh.ta "sought-out by pigs". He cites Neumann's suggestion that if a plant called "sought-out by pigs" exists then suukaramaddava can mean "pig's delight".) Whatever the case, none of the sources which mention the last meal attribute the Buddha's sickness to the meal itself.

As per the Mahaparinibbana sutta, after the meal with Cunda, the Buddha and his companions continued travelling until he was too weak to continue and had to stop at Kushinagar, where Ānanda had a resting place prepared in a grove of Sala trees. After announcing to the sangha at large that he would soon be passing away to final Nirvana, the Buddha ordained one last novice into the order personally. His name was Subhadda. He then repeated his final instructions to the sangha, which was that the Dhamma and Vinaya was to be their teacher after his death. Then he asked if anyone had any doubts about the teaching, but nobody did. The Buddha's final words are reported to have been: "All saṅkhāras decay. Strive for the goal with diligence (appamāda)" (Pali: 'vayadhammā saṅkhārā appamādena sampādethā').

He then entered his final meditation and died, reaching what is known as parinirvana (final nirvana; instead of a person being reborn, "the five aggregates of physical and mental phenomena that constitute a being cease to occur"). The Mahaparinibbana reports that in his final meditation he entered the four dhyanas consecutively, then the four immaterial attainments and finally the meditative dwelling known as nirodha-samāpatti, before returning to the fourth dhyana right at the moment of death.

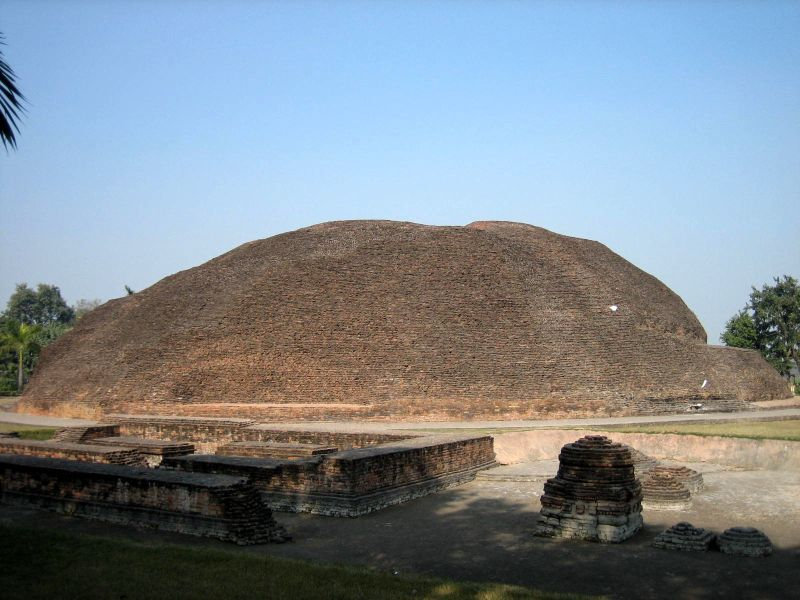
Buddha's cremation stupa, Kushinagar (Kushinara)

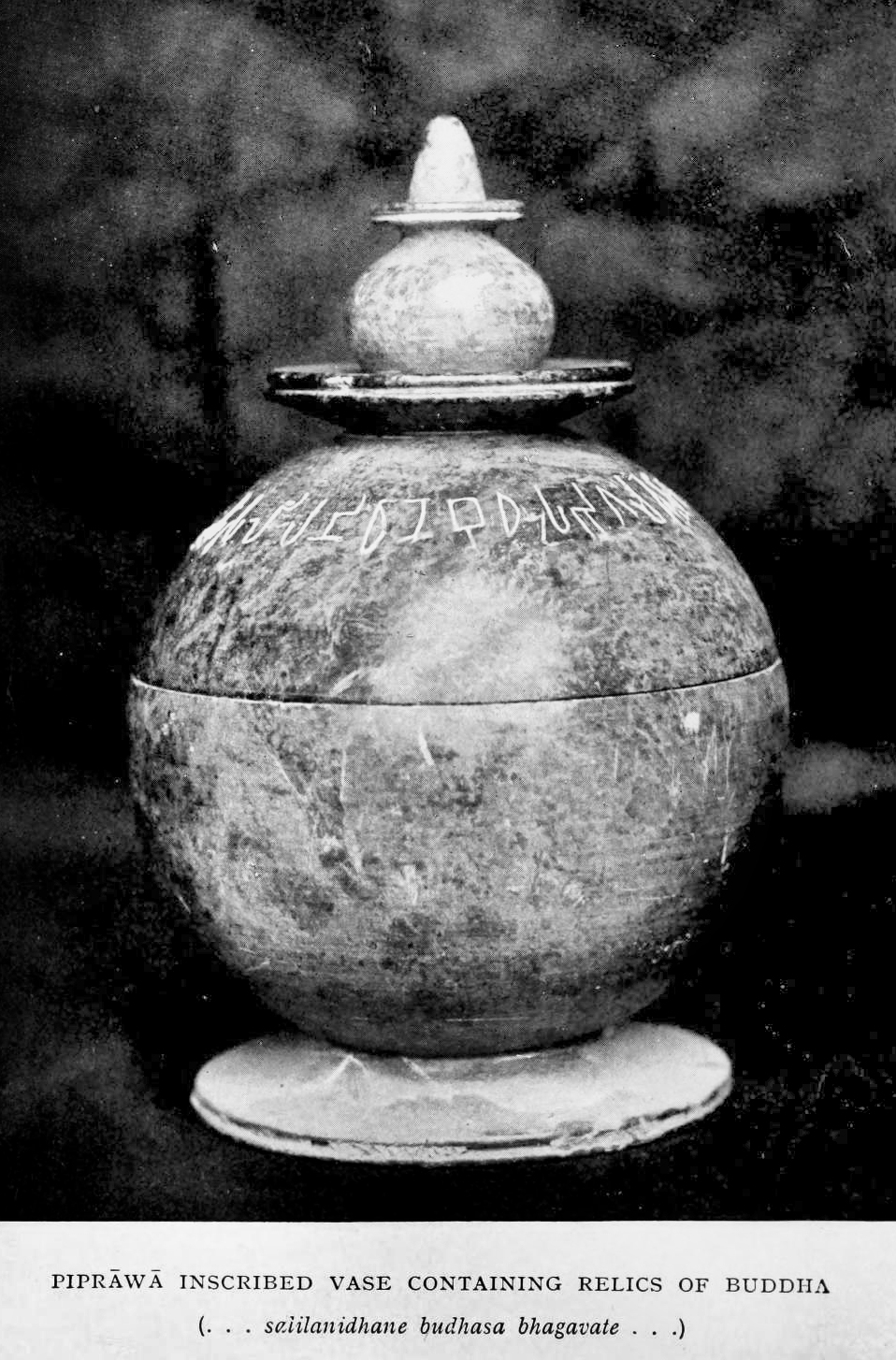
Piprahwa vase with relics of the Buddha. The inscription reads: ...salilanidhane Budhasa Bhagavate... (Brahmi script: ...𑀲𑀮𑀺𑀮𑀦𑀺𑀥𑀸𑀦𑁂 𑀩𑀼𑀥𑀲 𑀪𑀕𑀯𑀢𑁂...) "Relics of the Buddha Lord".

=== Posthumous events ===
According to the Mahaparinibbana sutta, the Mallians of Kushinagar spent the days following the Buddha's death honouring his body with flowers, music and scents. The sangha waited until the eminent elder Mahākassapa arrived to pay his respects before cremating the body.

The Buddha's body was then cremated and the remains, including his bones, were kept as relics and they were distributed among various north Indian kingdoms like Magadha, Shakya and Koliya. These relics were placed in monuments or mounds called stupas, a common funerary practice at the time. Centuries later they would be exhumed and enshrined by Ashoka into many new stupas around the Mauryan realm. Many supernatural legends surround the history of alleged relics as they accompanied the spread of Buddhism and gave legitimacy to rulers.

According to various Buddhist sources, the First Buddhist Council was held shortly after the Buddha's death to collect, recite and memorise the teachings. Mahākassapa was chosen by the sangha to be the chairman of the council. However, the historicity of the traditional accounts of the first council is disputed by modern scholars.

== Teachings and views ==
Intuiting the original doctrines of the Buddha, and to what extent the precepts of contemporary Buddhism reflect these teachings, is a difficult task. Many of the core principles of Buddhism, including the Eightfold Path, Four Noble Truths, and the concept of moksha, appear to have come after the Buddha himself, and the extent to which the Buddha engaged in philosophical inquiry is uncertain. The earliest surviving Buddhist texts are already sectarian in nature, and reconstructing the beliefs of pre-sectarian Buddhism is rife with difficulties and disagreements among scholars, not all of whom believe a meaningful reconstruction is possible.

=== Historicity ===
==== Scholarly views on the earliest teachings ====
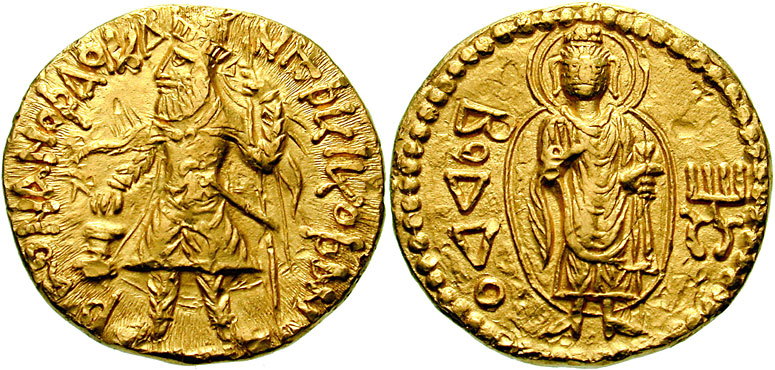
Depiction of the Buddha (with legend in Greek ΒΟΔΔΟ "Boddo") on the reverse of Kushan ruler Kanishka's coinage (127–150 CE).

One method to obtain information on the oldest core of Buddhism is to compare the oldest versions of the Pali Canon and other texts, such as the surviving portions of Sarvastivada, Mulasarvastivada, Mahisasaka, Dharmaguptaka, and the Chinese Agamas. The reliability of these sources, and the possibility of drawing out a core of oldest teachings, is a matter of dispute. According to Lambert Schmithausen, there are three positions held by modern scholars of Buddhism with regard to the authenticity of the teachings contained in the Nikayas:

1. "Stress on the fundamental homogeneity and substantial authenticity of at least a considerable part of the Nikayic materials". (Note: Two well-known proponent of this position are A.K. Warder and Richard Gombrich.: According to A.K. Warder, in his 1970 publication Indian Buddhism, "from the oldest extant texts a common kernel can be drawn out". According to Warder, c.q. his publisher: "This kernel of doctrine is presumably common Buddhism of the period before the great schisms of the fourth and third centuries BCE. It may be substantially the Buddhism of the Buddha himself, although this cannot be proved: at any rate it is a Buddhism presupposed by the schools as existing about a hundred years after the parinirvana of the Buddha, and there is no evidence to suggest that it was formulated by anyone else than the Buddha and his immediate followers".; Richard Gombrich: "I have the greatest difficulty in accepting that the main edifice is not the work of a single genius. By "the main edifice" I mean the collections of the main body of sermons, the four Nikāyas, and of the main body of monastic rules.")
2. "Scepticism with regard to the possibility of retrieving the doctrine of earliest Buddhism". (Note: A proponent of the second position is Ronald Davidson.: Ronald Davidson: "While most scholars agree that there was a rough body of sacred literature (disputed) [sic] that a relatively early community (disputed) [sic] maintained and transmitted, we have little confidence that much, if any, of surviving Buddhist scripture is actually the word of the historical Buddha.")
3. "Cautious optimism in this respect". (Note: Well-known proponents of the third position are: J.W. de Jong: "It would be hypocritical to assert that nothing can be said about the doctrine of earliest Buddhism [...] the basic ideas of Buddhism found in the canonical writings could very well have been proclaimed by him [the Buddha], transmitted and developed by his disciples and, finally, codified in fixed formulas."; Johannes Bronkhorst: "This position is to be preferred to (ii) for purely methodological reasons: only those who seek may find, even if no success is guaranteed."; Donald Lopez: "The original teachings of the historical Buddha are extremely difficult, if not impossible, to recover or reconstruct.")

Scholars such as Richard Gombrich, Akira Hirakawa, Alexander Wynne and A.K. Warder hold that these early Buddhist texts contain material that could possibly be traced to the Buddha. Richard Gombrich argues that since the content of the earliest texts "presents such originality, intelligence, grandeur and—most relevantly—coherence...it is hard to see it as a composite work." Thus he concludes they are "the work of one genius". Peter Harvey also agrees that "much" of the Pali Canon "must derive from his [the Buddha's] teachings". Likewise, A. K. Warder has written that "there is no evidence to suggest that it [the shared teaching of the early schools] was formulated by anyone other than the Buddha and his immediate followers." According to Alexander Wynne, "the internal evidence of the early Buddhist literature proves its historical authenticity."

Other scholars of Buddhist studies have disagreed with the mostly positive view that the early Buddhist texts reflect the teachings of the historical Buddha, arguing that some teachings contained in the early texts are the authentic teachings of the Buddha, but not others. Ainslie Embree writes that many sermons credited to the Buddha are the works of later teachers, so there is considerable doubt about his original message. According to Tilmann Vetter, inconsistencies remain, and other methods must be applied to resolve those inconsistencies. (Note: Exemplary studies are the study on descriptions of "liberating insight" by Lambert Schmithausen, the overview of early Buddhism by Tilmann Vetter, the philological work on the four truths by K.R. Norman, the textual studies by Richard Gombrich, and the research on early meditation methods by Johannes Bronkhorst.) According to Tilmann Vetter, the earliest core of the Buddhist teachings is the meditative practice of dhyāna, (Note: Vetter: "However, if we look at the last, and in my opinion the most important, component of this list [the noble eightfold path], we are still dealing with what according to me is the real content of the middle way, dhyana-meditation, at least the stages two to four, which are said to be free of contemplation and reflection. Everything preceding the eighth part, i.e. right samadhi, apparently has the function of preparing for the right samadhi.") but "liberating insight" became an essential feature of the Buddhist tradition only at a later date.

He posits that the Fourth Noble Truths, the eightfold path and dependent origination, which are commonly seen as essential to Buddhism, are later formulations which form part of the explanatory framework of this "liberating insight". Lambert Schmithausen similarly argues that the mention of the four noble truths as constituting "liberating insight", which is attained after mastering the four dhyānas, is a later addition. Johannes Bronkhorst also argues that the four truths may not have been formulated in earliest Buddhism, and did not serve in earliest Buddhism as a description of "liberating insight".

Edward Conze argued that the attempts of European scholars to reconstruct the original teachings of the Buddha were "all mere guesswork".

=== Core teachings ===
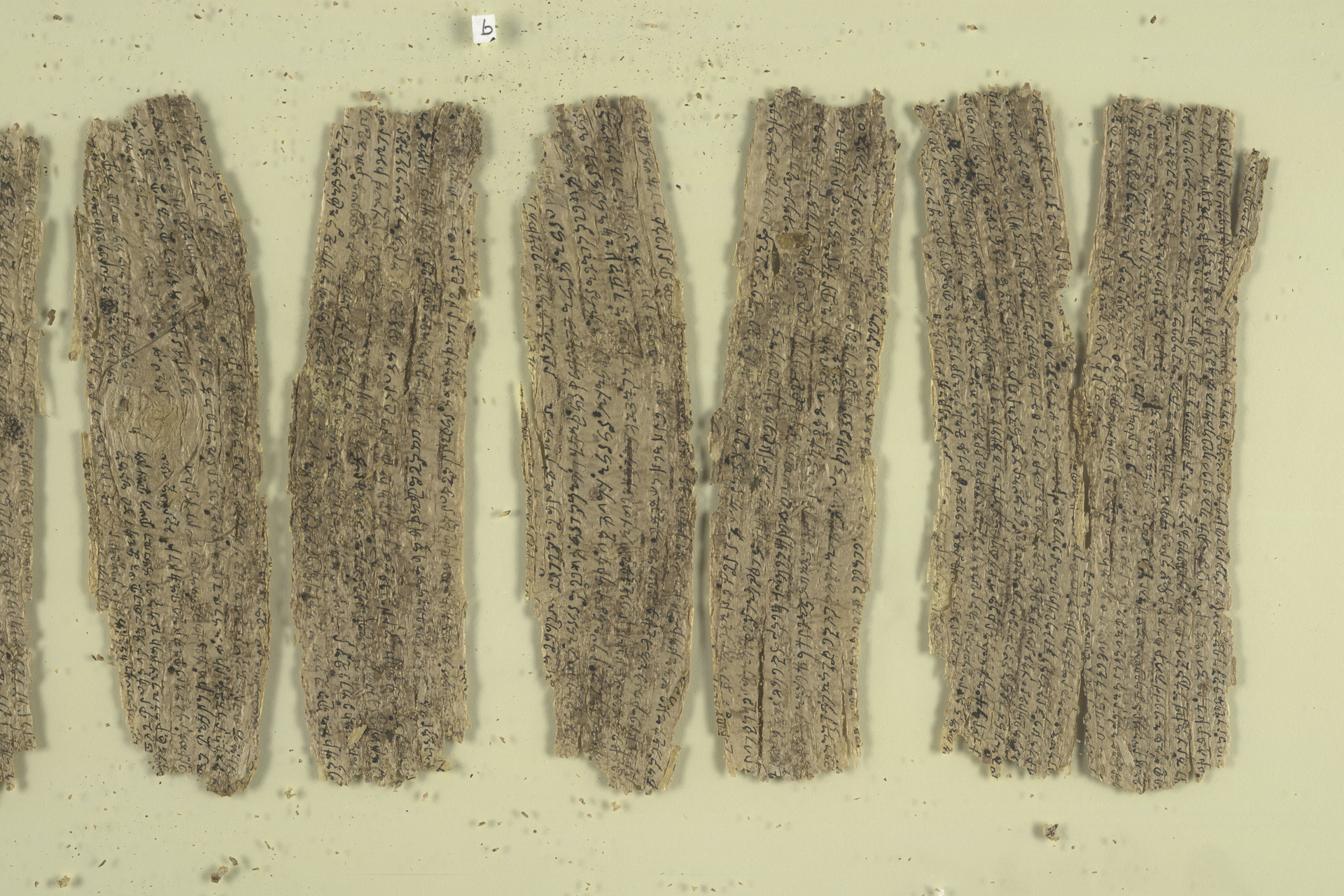
Gandharan Buddhist birchbark scroll fragments

A number of teachings and practices are deemed essential to Buddhism, including: the samyojana (fetters, chains or bounds), that is, the sankharas ("formations"), the kleshas (unwholesome mental states), including the three poisons, and the āsavas ("influx, canker"), that perpetuate saṃsāra, the repeated cycle of becoming; the six sense bases and the five aggregates, which describe the process from sense contact to consciousness which lead to this bondage to saṃsāra; dependent origination, which describes this process, and its reversal, in detail; and the Middle Way, summarised by the later tradition in the Four Noble Truths and the Noble Eightfold Path, which prescribes how this bondage can be reversed.

According to N. Ross Reat, the Theravada Pali texts and the Mahasamghika school's Śālistamba Sūtra share these basic teachings and practices. Bhikkhu Analayo concludes that the Theravada Majjhima Nikaya and Sarvastivada Madhyama Agama contain mostly the same major doctrines. Likewise, Richard Salomon has written that the doctrines found in the Gandharan Manuscripts are "consistent with non-Mahayana Buddhism, which survives today in the Theravada school of Sri Lanka and Southeast Asia, but which in ancient times was represented by eighteen separate schools".

==== Samsara ====
All beings have deeply entrenched samyojana (fetters, chains or bounds), that is, the sankharas ("formations"), kleshas (unwholesome mental states), including the three poisons, and āsavas ("influx, canker"), that perpetuate saṃsāra, the repeated cycle of becoming and rebirth. According to the Pali suttas, the Buddha stated that "this saṃsāra is without discoverable beginning. A first point is not discerned of beings roaming and wandering on hindered by ignorance and fettered by craving." In the Dutiyalokadhammasutta sutta (AN 8:6) the Buddha explains how "eight worldly winds" "keep the world turning around [...] Gain and loss, fame and disrepute, praise and blame, pleasure and pain". He then explains how the difference between a noble (arya) person and an uninstructed worldling is that a noble person reflects on and understands the impermanence of these conditions.

This cycle of becoming is characterised by dukkha, commonly referred to as "suffering", dukkha is more aptly rendered as "unsatisfactoriness" or "unease". It is the unsatisfactoriness and unease that comes with a life dictated by automatic responses and habituated selfishness, and the unsatifacories of expecting enduring happiness from things which are impermanent, unstable and thus unreliable. The ultimate noble goal should be liberation from this cycle.

Samsara is dictated by karma, which is an impersonal natural law, similar to how certain seeds produce certain plants and fruits. Karma is not the only cause for one's conditions, as the Buddha listed various physical and environmental causes alongside karma. The Buddha's teaching of karma differed to that of the Jains and Brahmins, in that on his view, karma is primarily mental intention (as opposed to mainly physical action or ritual acts). The Buddha is reported to have said "By karma I mean intention." Richard Gombrich summarises the Buddha's view of karma as follows: "all thoughts, words, and deeds derive their moral value, positive or negative, from the intention behind them".

==== The six sense bases and the five aggregates ====
The āyatana (six sense bases) and the five skandhas (aggregates) describe how sensory contact leads to attachment and dukkha. The six sense bases are eye and sight, ear and sound, nose and odour, tongue and taste, body and touch, and mind and thoughts. Together they create the input from which we create our world or reality, "the all". This process takes place through the five skandhas, "aggregates", "groups", "heaps", five groups of physical and mental processes, namely form (or material image, impression) (rupa), sensations (or feelings, received from form) (vedana), perceptions (samjna), mental activity or formations (sankhara), consciousness (vijnana). They form part of other Buddhist teachings and lists, such as dependent origination, and explain how sensory input ultimately leads to bondage to samsara by the mental defilements.

==== Dependent origination ====
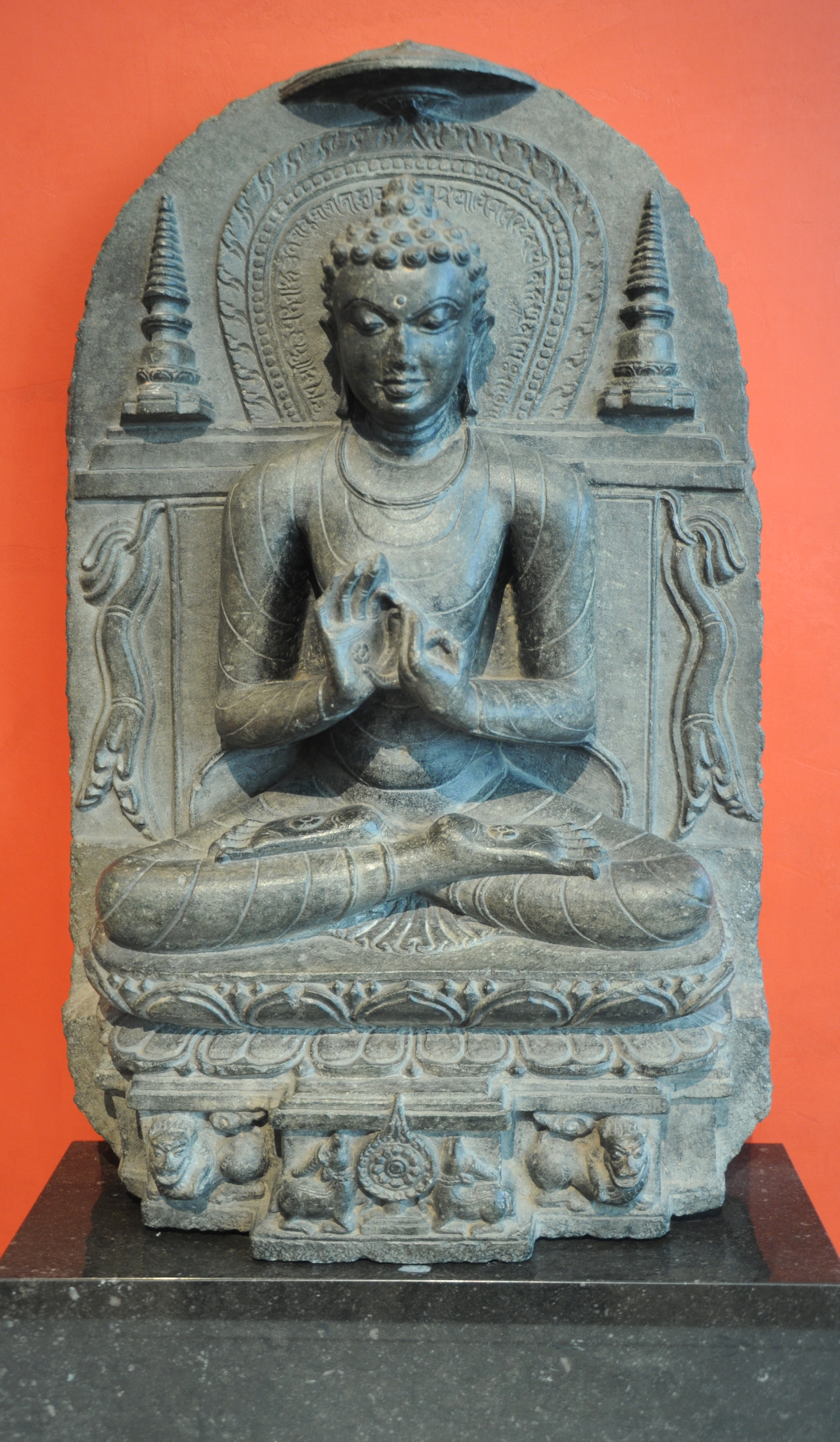
Schist Buddha statue with the famed Ye Dharma Hetu dhāraṇī around the head, which was used as a common summary of dependent origination. It states: "Of those experiences that arise from a cause, The Tathāgata has said: 'this is their cause, And this is their cessation': This is what the Great Śramaṇa teaches."

In the early texts, the process of the arising of dukkha is explicated through the teaching of dependent origination, which says that everything that exists or occurs is dependent on conditioning factors. The most basic formulation of dependent origination is given in the early texts as: 'It being thus, this comes about' (Pali: evam sati idam hoti). This can be taken to mean that certain phenomena only arise when there are other phenomena present, thus their arising is "dependent" on other phenomena.

The philosopher Mark Siderits has outlined the basic idea of the Buddha's teaching of dependent origination of dukkha as follows:

given the existence of a fully functioning assemblage of psycho-physical elements (the parts that make up a sentient being), ignorance concerning the three characteristics of sentient existence—suffering, impermanence and non-self—will lead, in the course of normal interactions with the environment, to appropriation (the identification of certain elements as 'I' and 'mine'). This leads in turn to the formation of attachments, in the form of desire and aversion, and the strengthening of ignorance concerning the true nature of sentient existence. These ensure future rebirth, and thus future instances of old age, disease and death, in a potentially unending cycle.

In numerous early texts, this basic principle is expanded with a list of phenomena that are said to be conditionally dependent, (Note: One common basic list of twelve elements in the Early Buddhist Texts goes as follows: "Conditioned by (1) ignorance are (2) formations, conditioned by formations is (3) consciousness, conditioned by consciousness is (4) mind-and-body, conditioned by mind-and-body are (5) the six senses, conditioned by the six senses is (6) sense-contact, conditioned by sense-contact is (7) feeling, conditioned by feeling is (8) craving, conditioned by craving is (9) grasping, conditioned by grasping is (10) becoming, conditioned by becoming is (11) birth, conditioned by birth is (12) old-age and death-grief, lamentation, pain, sorrow, and despair come into being. Thus is the arising of this whole mass of suffering.") as a result of later elaborations, (Note: Shulman refers to Schmitthausen (2000), Zur Zwolfgliedrigen Formel des Entstehens in Abhangigkeit, in Horin: Vergleichende Studien zur Japanischen Kultur, 7) including Vedic cosmogenies as the basis for the first four links. According to Boisvert, nidana 3-10 correlate with the five skandhas. According to Richard Gombrich, the twelve-fold list is a combination of two previous lists, the second list beginning with tanha, "thirst", the cause of suffering as described in the second noble truth". According to Gombrich, the two lists were combined, resulting in contradictions in its reverse version. (Note: Gombrich: "The six senses, and thence, via 'contact' and 'feeling', to thirst". It is quite plausible, however, that someone failed to notice that once the first four links became part of the chain, its negative version meant that in order to abolish ignorance one first had to abolish consciousness!")

===== Anatta =====
The Buddha saw his analysis of dependent origination as a "Middle Way" between "eternalism" (sassatavada, the idea that some essence exists eternally) and "annihilationism" (ucchedavada, the idea that we go completely out of existence at death). in this view, persons are just a causal series of impermanent psycho-physical elements, which are anatta, without an independent or permanent self. The Buddha instead held that all things in the world of our experience are transient and that there is no unchanging part to a person. According to Richard Gombrich, the Buddha's position is simply that "everything is process".

The Buddha's arguments against an unchanging self rely on the scheme of the five skandhas, as can be seen in the Pali Anattalakkhaṇa Sutta (and its parallels in Gandhari and Chinese). In the early texts the Buddha teaches that all five aggregates, including consciousness (viññana, which was held by Brahmins to be eternal), arise due to dependent origination. Since they are all impermanent, one cannot regard any of the psycho-physical processes as an unchanging self. Even mental processes such as consciousness and will (cetana) are seen as being dependently originated and impermanent and thus do not qualify as a self (atman).

The Buddha saw the belief in a self as arising from our grasping at and identifying with the various changing phenomena, as well as from ignorance about how things really are. Furthermore, the Buddha held that we experience suffering because we hold on to erroneous self views. As Rupert Gethin explains, for the Buddha, a person is

... a complex flow of physical and mental phenomena, but peel away these phenomena and look behind them and one just does not find a constant self that one can call one's own. My sense of self is both logically and emotionally just a label that I impose on these physical and mental phenomena in consequence of their connectedness.

Due to this view (termed), the Buddha's teaching was opposed to all soul theories of his time, including the Jain theory of a "jiva" ("life monad") and the Brahmanical theories of atman (Pali: atta) and purusha. All of these theories held that there was an eternal unchanging essence to a person, which was separate from all changing experiences, and which transmigrated from life to life. The Buddha's anti-essentialist view still includes an understanding of continuity through rebirth, it is just the rebirth of a process (karma), not an essence like the atman.

==== The path to liberation ====
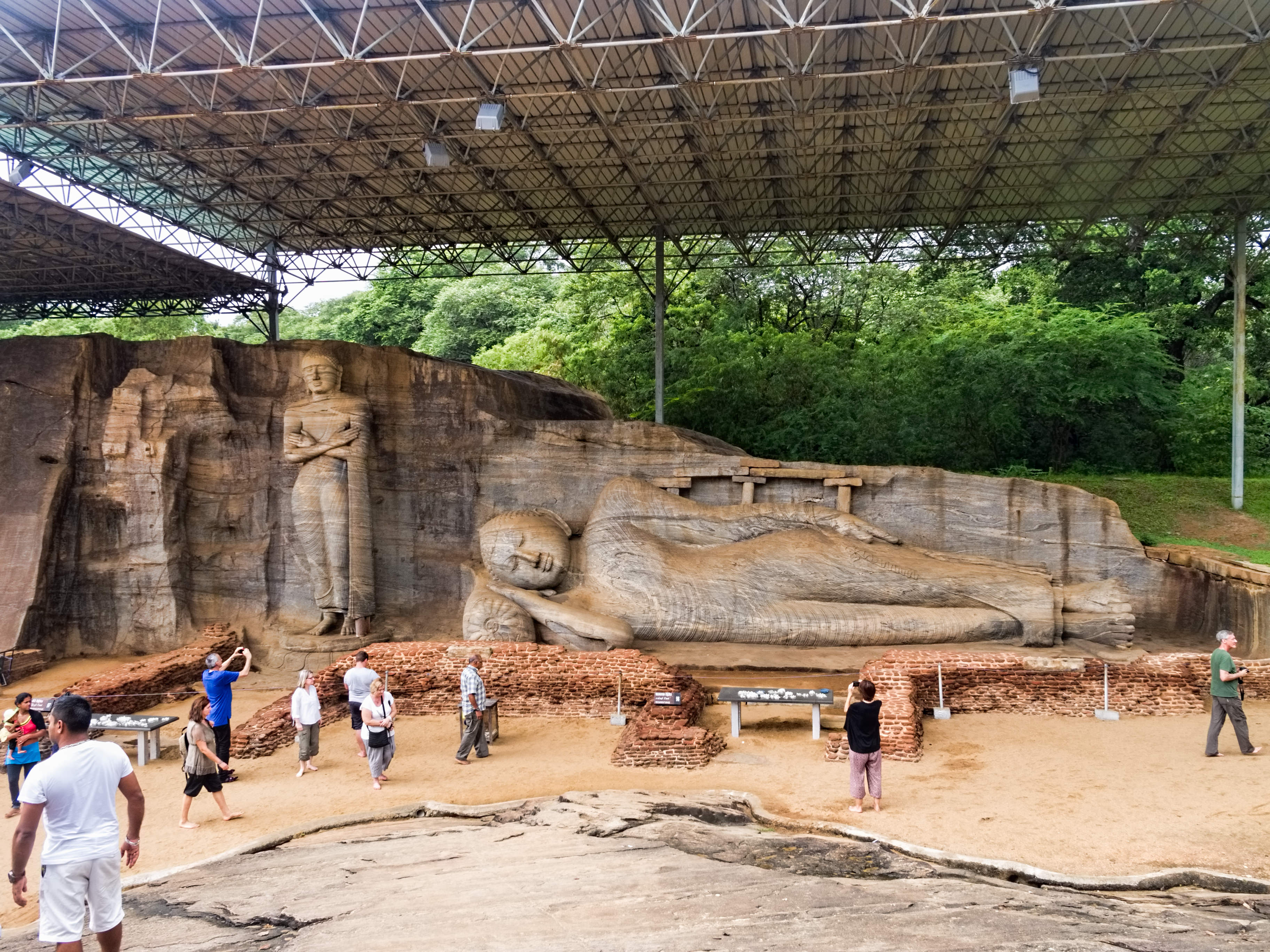
Buddha statues from Gal Vihara. The Early Buddhist texts also mention meditation practice while standing and lying down.

The Buddha taught a path (marga) of training to undo the samyojana, kleshas and āsavas and attain vimutti (liberation). This path taught by the Buddha is depicted in the early texts (most famously in the Pali Dhammacakkappavattana Sutta and its numerous parallel texts) as a "Middle Way" between sensual indulgence on one hand and mortification of the body on the other.

A common presentation of the core structure of Buddha's teaching found in the early texts is that of the Four Noble Truths, which refers to the Noble Eightfold Path. (Note: right view; right intention, right speech, right action, right livelihood, right effort, right mindfulness, and right concentration.) According to Gethin, another common summary of the path to awakening wisely used in the early texts is "abandoning the hindrances, practice of the four establishments of mindfulness and development of the awakening factors".

According to Rupert Gethin, in the Nikayas and Agamas, the Buddha's path is mainly presented in a cumulative and gradual "step by step" process, such as that outlined in the Samaññaphala Sutta. (Note: Early texts that outline the graduated path include the Cula-Hatthipadopama-sutta (MN 27, with Chinese parallel at MĀ 146) and the Tevijja Sutta (DN 13, with Chinese parallel at DĀ 26 and a fragmentary Sanskrit parallel entitled the Vāsiṣṭha-sūtra). Gethin adds: "This schema is assumed and, in one way or another, adapted by the later manuals such as the Visuddhimagga, the Abhidharmakosa, Kamalasila's Bhavanakrama ('Stages of Meditation', eighth century) and also Chinese and later Tibetan works such as Chih-i's Mo-ho chih-kuan ('Great Calm and Insight') and Hsiu-hsi chih-kuan tso-ch'an fa-yao ('The Essentials for Sitting in Meditation and Cultivating Calm and Insight', sixth century), sGam-po-pa's Thar-pa rin-po che'i rgyan ('Jewel Ornament of Liberation', twelfth century) and Tsong-kha-pa's Lam rim chen mo ('Great Graduated Path', fourteenth century).) Other early texts like the Upanisa sutta (SN 12.23), present the path as reversions of the process of Dependent Origination. (Note: As Gethin notes: "A significant ancient variation on the formula of dependent arising, having detailed the standard sequence of conditions leading to the arising of this whole mass of suffering, thus goes on to state that: Conditioned by (1) suffering, there is (2) faith, conditioned by faith, there is (3) gladness, conditioned by gladness, there is (4) joy, conditioned by joy, there is (5) tranquillity, conditioned by tranquillity, there is (6) happiness, conditioned by happiness, there is (7) concentration, conditioned by concentration, there is (8) knowledge and vision of what truly is, conditioned by knowledge and vision of what truly is, there is (9) disenchantment, conditioned by disenchantment, there is (10) dispassion, conditioned by dispassion, there is (11) freedom, conditioned by freedom, there is (12) knowledge that the defilements are destroyed.")

Bhāvanā, cultivation of wholesome states, is central to the Buddha's path. Common practices to this goal, which are shared by most of these early presentations of the path, include sila (ethical training), restraint of the senses (indriyasamvara), sati (mindfulness) and sampajañña (clear awareness), and the practice of dhyana, the cumulative development of wholesome states leading to a "state of perfect equanimity and awareness (upekkhā-sati-parisuddhi)". Dhyana is preceded and supported by various aspects of the path such as sense restraint and mindfulness, which is elaborated in the satipatthana-scheme, as taught in the Pali Satipatthana Sutta and the sixteen elements of Anapanasati, as taught in the Anapanasati Sutta. (Note: For a comparative survey of Satipatthana in the Pali, Tibetan and Chinese sources, see: Anālayo (2014). Perspectives on Satipatthana.. For a comparative survey of Anapanasati, see: Dhammajoti, K.L. (2008). "Sixteen-mode Mindfulness of Breathing". JCBSSL. VI..)

==== Jain and Brahmanical influences ====
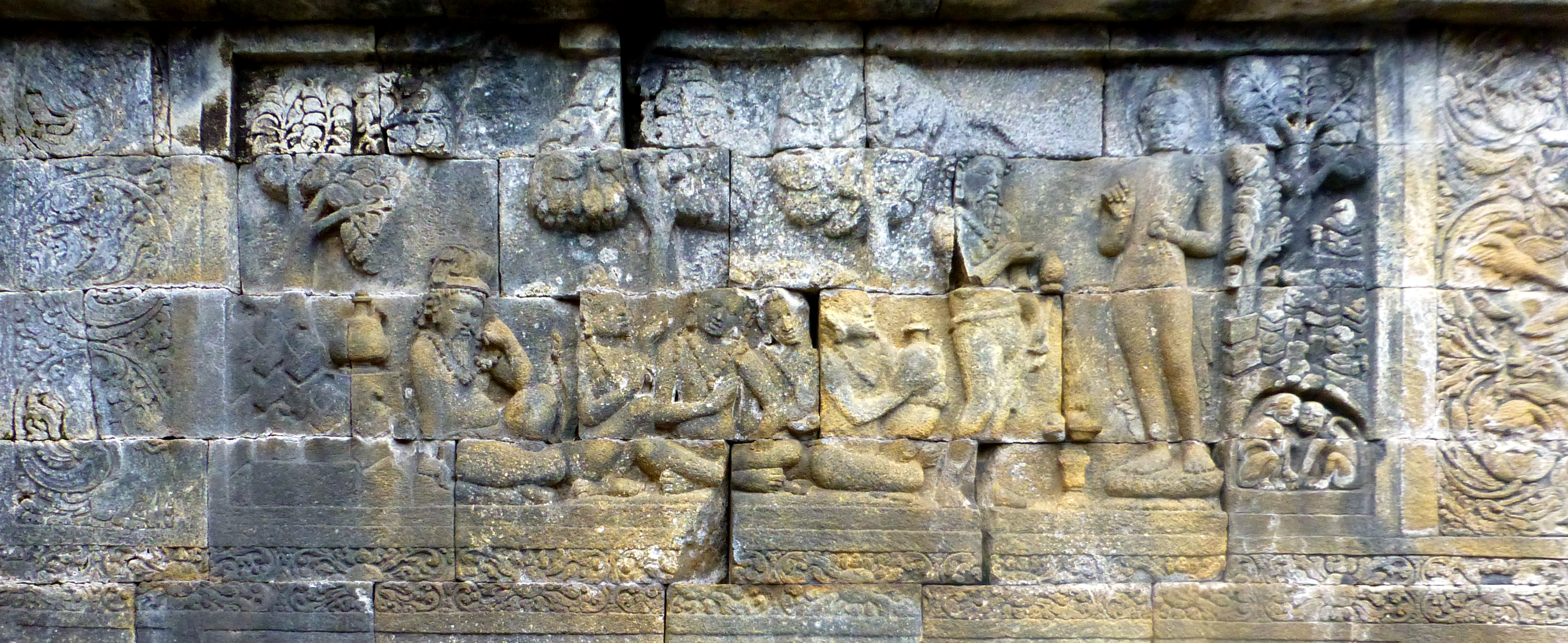
The Bodhisattva meets with Alara Kalama, Borobudur relief.

In various texts, the Buddha is depicted as having studied under two named teachers, Āḷāra Kālāma and Uddaka Rāmaputta. According to Alexander Wynne, these were Brahmanical yogis who taught doctrines and practices similar to those in the Upanishads. According to Johannes Bronkhorst, the "meditation without breath and reduced intake of food" which the Buddha practiced before his awakening are forms of asceticism which are similar to Jain practices.

According to Richard Gombrich, the Buddha's teachings on karma and rebirth are a development of pre-Buddhist themes that can be found in Jain and Brahmanical sources, like the Brihadaranyaka Upanishad. Likewise, samsara, the idea that we are trapped in cycles of rebirth and that we should seek liberation from them through non-harming (ahimsa) and spiritual practices, pre-dates the Buddha and was likely taught in early Jainism. According to K.R. Norman, the Buddhist teaching of the three marks of existence (Note: Understanding of these marks helps in the development of detachment: Anicca (Sanskrit: anitya): That all things that come to have an end; Dukkha (Sanskrit: duḥkha): That nothing which comes to be is ultimately satisfying; Anattā (Sanskrit: anātman): That nothing in the realm of experience can really be said to be "I" or "mine".) may also reflect Upanishadic or other influences. The Buddhist practice called Brahma-vihara may have also originated from a Brahmanic term; but its usage may have been common in the sramana traditions.

=== Homeless life ===
The early Buddhist texts depict the Buddha as promoting the life of a homeless and celibate "sramana", or mendicant, as the ideal way of life for the practice of the path. He taught that mendicants or "beggars" (bhikkhus) were supposed to give up all possessions and to own just a begging bowl and three robes. As part of the Buddha's monastic discipline, they were also supposed to rely on the wider lay community for the basic necessities (mainly food, clothing, and lodging).

The Buddha's teachings on monastic discipline were preserved in the various Vinaya collections of the different early schools.

Buddhist monastics, which included both monks and nuns, were supposed to beg for their food, were not allowed to store up food or eat after noon and they were not allowed to use gold, silver or any valuables.

=== Society ===
==== Critique of Brahmanism ====
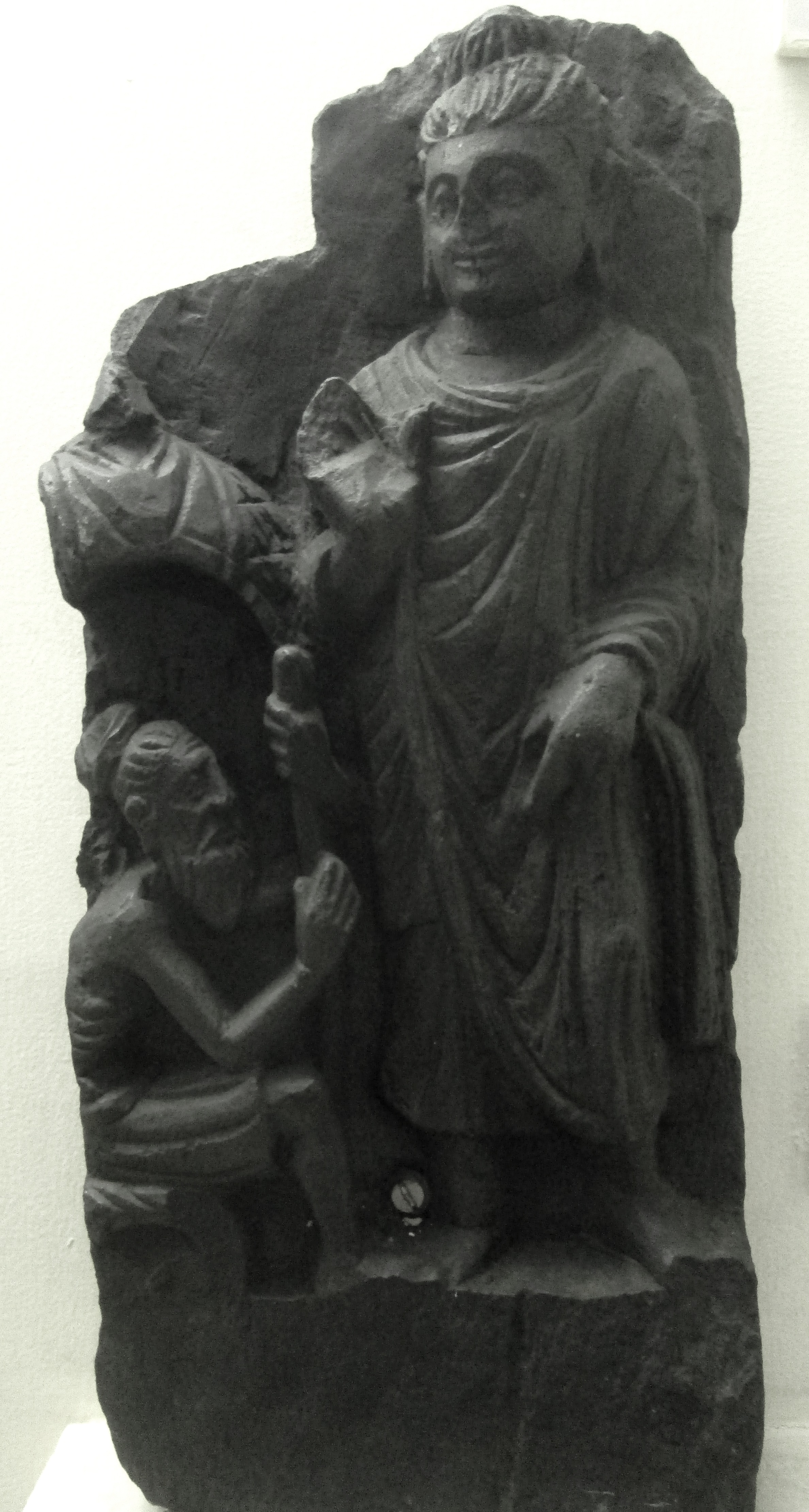
Buddha meets a Brahmin, at the Indian Museum, Kolkata.

According to Bronkhorst, "the bearers of [the Brahmanical] tradition, the Brahmins, did not occupy a dominant position in the area in which the Buddha preached his message." Nevertheless, the Buddha was acquainted with Brahmanism, and in the early Buddhist Texts, the Buddha references Brahmanical devices. For example, in Samyutta Nikaya 111, Majjhima Nikaya 92 and Vinaya i 246 of the Pali Canon, the Buddha praises the Agnihotra as the foremost sacrifice and the Sāvitrī meter as the foremost meter. (Note: aggihuttamukhā yaññā sāvittī chandaso mukham. Sacrifices have the Agnihotra as foremost; of meter, the foremost is the Sāvitrī.) In general, the Buddha critiques the animal sacrifices and social system on certain key points.

The Brahmin caste held that the Vedas were eternal revealed (sruti) texts. The Buddha, on the other hand, did not accept that these texts had any divine authority or value.

The Buddha also did not see the Brahmanical rites and practices as useful for spiritual advancement. For example, in the Udāna, the Buddha points out that ritual bathing does not lead to purity: only "truth and morality" lead to purity. (Note: "Not by water man becomes pure; people here bathe too much; in whom there is truth and morality, he is pure, he is (really) a brahman") He especially critiqued animal sacrifice as taught in Vedas. The Buddha contrasted his teachings, which were taught openly to all people, with that of the Brahmins', who kept their mantras secret. (Note: "These three things, monks, are conducted in secret, not openly. What three? Affairs with women, the mantras of the brahmins, and wrong view. But these three things, monks, shine openly, not in secret. What three? The moon, the sun, and the Dhamma and Discipline proclaimed by the Tathagata." AN 3.129)

The Buddha also critiqued the Brahmins' claims of superior birth and the idea that different castes and bloodlines were inherently pure or impure, noble or ignoble.

In the Vasettha sutta the Buddha argues that the main difference among humans is not birth but their actions and occupations. According to the Buddha, one is a "Brahmin" (i.e., divine, like Brahma) only to the extent that one has cultivated virtue. (Note: "In a favourite stanza quoted several times in the Pali Canon: "The Kshatriya is the best among those people who believe in lineage; but he, who is endowed with knowledge and good conduct, is the best among Gods and men".) Because of this the early texts report that he proclaimed: "Not by birth one is a Brahman, not by birth one is a non-Brahman; – by moral action one is a Brahman"

The Aggañña Sutta explains all classes or varnas can be good or bad and gives a sociological explanation for how they arose, against the Brahmanical idea that they are divinely ordained. According to Kancha Ilaiah, the Buddha posed the first contract theory of society. The Buddha's teaching then is a single universal moral law, one Dharma valid for everybody, which is opposed to the Brahmanic ethic founded on "one's own duty" (svadharma) which depends on caste. Because of this, all castes including untouchables were welcome in the Buddhist order and when someone joined, they renounced all caste affiliation.

==== Socio-political teachings ====
The early texts depict the Buddha as giving a deflationary account of the importance of politics to human life. Politics is inevitable and is probably even necessary and helpful, but it is also a tremendous waste of time and effort, as well as being a prime temptation to allow ego to run rampant. Buddhist political theory denies that people have a moral duty to engage in politics except to a very minimal degree (pay the taxes, obey the laws, maybe vote in the elections), and it actively portrays engagement in politics and the pursuit of enlightenment as being conflicting paths in life.

In the Aggañña Sutta, the Buddha teaches a history of how monarchy arose which according to Matthew J. Moore is "closely analogous to a social contract". The Aggañña Sutta also provides a social explanation of how different classes arose, in contrast to the Vedic views on social caste.

Other early texts like the Cakkavatti-Sīhanāda Sutta and the Mahāsudassana Sutta focus on the figure of the righteous wheel turning leader (Cakkavatti). This ideal leader is one who promotes Dharma through his governance. He can only achieve his status through moral purity and must promote morality and Dharma to maintain his position. According to the Cakkavatti-Sīhanāda Sutta, the key duties of a Cakkavatti are: "establish guard, ward, and protection according to Dhamma for your own household, your troops, your nobles, and vassals, for Brahmins and householders, town and country folk, ascetics and Brahmins, for beasts and birds. let no crime prevail in your kingdom, and to those who are in need, give property." The sutta explains the injunction to give to the needy by telling how a line of wheel-turning monarchs falls because they fail to give to the needy, and thus the kingdom falls into infighting as poverty increases, which then leads to stealing and violence. (Note: "thus, from the not giving of property to the needy, poverty became rife, from the growth of poverty, the taking of what was not given increased, from the increase of theft, the use of weapons increased, from the increased use of weapons, the taking of life increased — and from the increase in the taking of life, people's life-span decreased, their beauty decreased, and [as] a result of this decrease of life-span and beauty, the children of those whose life-span had been eighty-thousand years lived for only forty thousand.")

In the Mahāparinibbāna Sutta, the Buddha outlines several principles that he promoted among the Vajjika tribal federation, which had a quasi-republican form of government. He taught them to "hold regular and frequent assemblies", live in harmony and maintain their traditions. The Buddha then goes on to promote a similar kind of republican style of government among the Buddhist Sangha, where all monks had equal rights to attend open meetings and there would be no single leader, since The Buddha also chose not to appoint one. Some scholars have argued that this fact signals that the Buddha preferred a republican form of government, while others disagree with this position.

==== Worldly happiness ====
As noted by Bhikkhu Bodhi, the Buddha as depicted in the Pali suttas does not exclusively teach a world-transcending goal, but also teaches laypersons how to achieve worldly happiness (sukha).

According to Bodhi, the "most comprehensive" of the suttas that focus on how to live as a layperson is the Sigālovāda Sutta (DN 31). This sutta outlines how a layperson behaves towards six basic social relationships: "parents and children, teacher and pupils, husband and wife, friend and friend, employer and workers, lay follower and religious guides". This Pali text also has parallels in Chinese and in Sanskrit fragments.

In another sutta (Dīghajāṇu Sutta, AN 8.54) the Buddha teaches two types of happiness. First, there is the happiness visible in this very life. The Buddha states that four things lead to this happiness: "The accomplishment of persistent effort, the accomplishment of protection, good friendship, and balanced living." Similarly, in several other suttas, the Buddha teaches on how to improve family relationships, particularly on the importance of filial love and gratitude as well as marital well-being.

Regarding the happiness of the next life, the Buddha (in the Dīghajāṇu Sutta) states that the virtues which lead to a good rebirth are: faith (in the Buddha and the teachings), moral discipline, especially keeping the five precepts, generosity, and wisdom (knowledge of the arising and passing of things).

According to the Buddha of the suttas then, achieving a good rebirth is based on cultivating wholesome or skillful (kusala) karma, which leads to a good result, and avoiding unwholesome (akusala) karma. A common list of good karmas taught by the Buddha is the list of ten courses of action (kammapatha) as outlined in MN 41 Saleyyaka Sutta (and its Chinese parallel in SĀ 1042).

Good karma is also termed merit (puñña), and the Buddha outlines three bases of meritorious actions: giving, moral discipline and meditation (as seen in AN 8:36).

== Physical characteristics ==
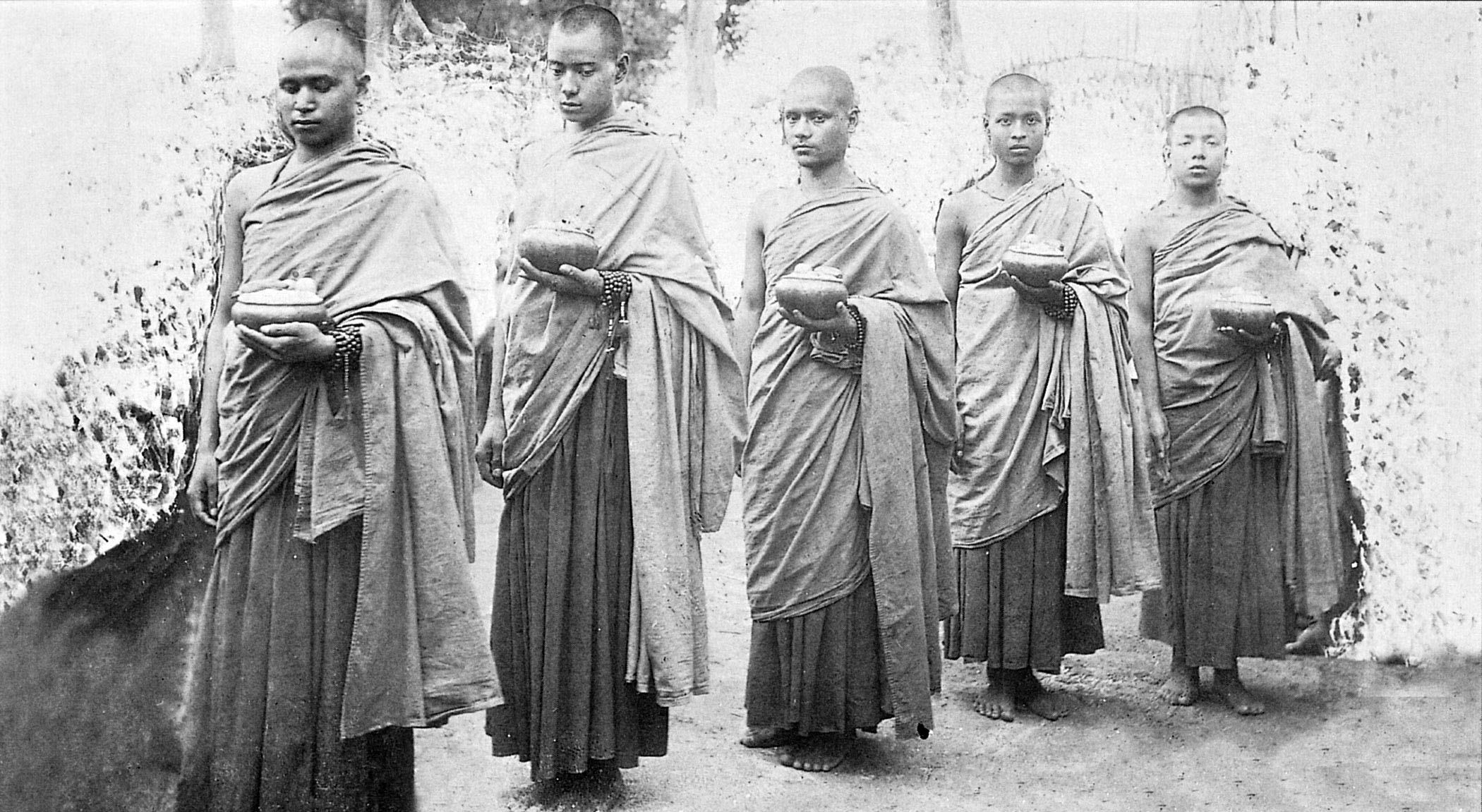
Buddhist monks from Nepal.

Early sources depict the Buddha's appearance as similar to other Buddhist monks. Various discourses describe how he "cut off his hair and beard" when renouncing the world. Likewise, Digha Nikaya 3 has a Brahmin describe the Buddha as a shaved or bald (mundaka) man. Digha Nikaya 2 also describes how king Ajatashatru is unable to tell which of the monks is the Buddha when approaching the sangha and must ask his minister to point him out. Likewise, in MN 140, a mendicant who sees himself as a follower of the Buddha meets the Buddha in person but is unable to recognise him.

The Buddha is also described as being handsome and with a clear complexion (Digha I:115; Anguttara I:181), at least in his youth. In old age, however, he is described as having a stooped body, with slack and wrinkled limbs.

Various Buddhist texts attribute to the Buddha a series of extraordinary physical characteristics, known as "the 32 Signs of the Great Man" (Skt. mahāpuruṣa lakṣaṇa).

According to Anālayo, when they first appear in the Buddhist texts, these physical marks were initially held to be imperceptible to the ordinary person, and required special training to detect. Later though, they are depicted as being visible by regular people and as inspiring faith in the Buddha.

These characteristics are described in the Digha Nikaya's Lakkhaṇa Sutta (D, I:142).

== Śākyamuni Buddha in Mahāyāna ==
Japanese silk embroidery of Śākyamuni Preaching, Nara National Museum, Nara, Japan. This embroidery is a National Treasure of Japan.

In Mahāyāna Buddhism, the figure of Śākyamuni Buddha (Chinese: 釋迦牟尼佛, romanized: Shìjiāmóunífó) retains his central role as the historical Buddha who lived and taught in ancient India. However, Mahāyāna developments introduce significant reinterpretations of his nature, activities, and metaphysical status, presenting a cosmic, timeless identity. Unlike the more human-centered portrayals, Mahāyāna works present Śākyamuni as a transcendent being of inconceivable qualities, who operates within a vast cosmological framework. Moreover, Mahāyāna sutras often depict Śākyamuni preaching in vast assemblies composed of bodhisattvas, gods, other Buddhas, and beings from other realms. These assemblies vastly exceed the human scale of early canonical suttas.

In many Mahāyāna scriptures, Śākyamuni is presented as the preacher of profound Mahāyāna teachings intended for advanced bodhisattvas. In contrast to the mainstream Nikāya/Āgama presentations of Śākyamuni as a renunciant teacher, Mahāyāna texts emphasise his boundless wisdom, vast power, and infinite compassion. Furthermore, according to Mahāyāna sutras, Śākyamuni teaches myriad teachings according to the capacities of beings. Thus, what appears to be the classic teaching of the sravakayana path taught in the Nikāyas/Āgamas is considered a provisional teaching, which is preparatory to the ultimate Mahāyāna Dharma. The Lotus Sūtra develops this idea most explicitly, portraying Śākyamuni as a master teacher who uses various skillful means (upaya) to guide beings to the One Vehicle (ekayāna) which leads to Buddhahood for all.

While Śākyamuni is the central Buddha of our world (often called Sahā), Mahāyāna cosmology includes countless Buddhas presiding over various buddhafields. Śākyamuni is often depicted as one among an infinite assembly of Buddhas, yet his salvific function remains paramount in many texts. The Avataṃsaka Sūtra also presents Śākyamuni as inseparable from the cosmic Buddha Vairocana. The Gaṇḍavyūha Sūtra (a part of the Avataṃsaka) describes Śākyamuni's activities as pervading all worlds and times, manifesting various forms for the sake of sentient beings. He is sometimes seen as a Buddha who simultaneously appears in countless forms (bodhisattvas, teachers, even ordinary beings), subverting any fixed notion of a singular historical presence.

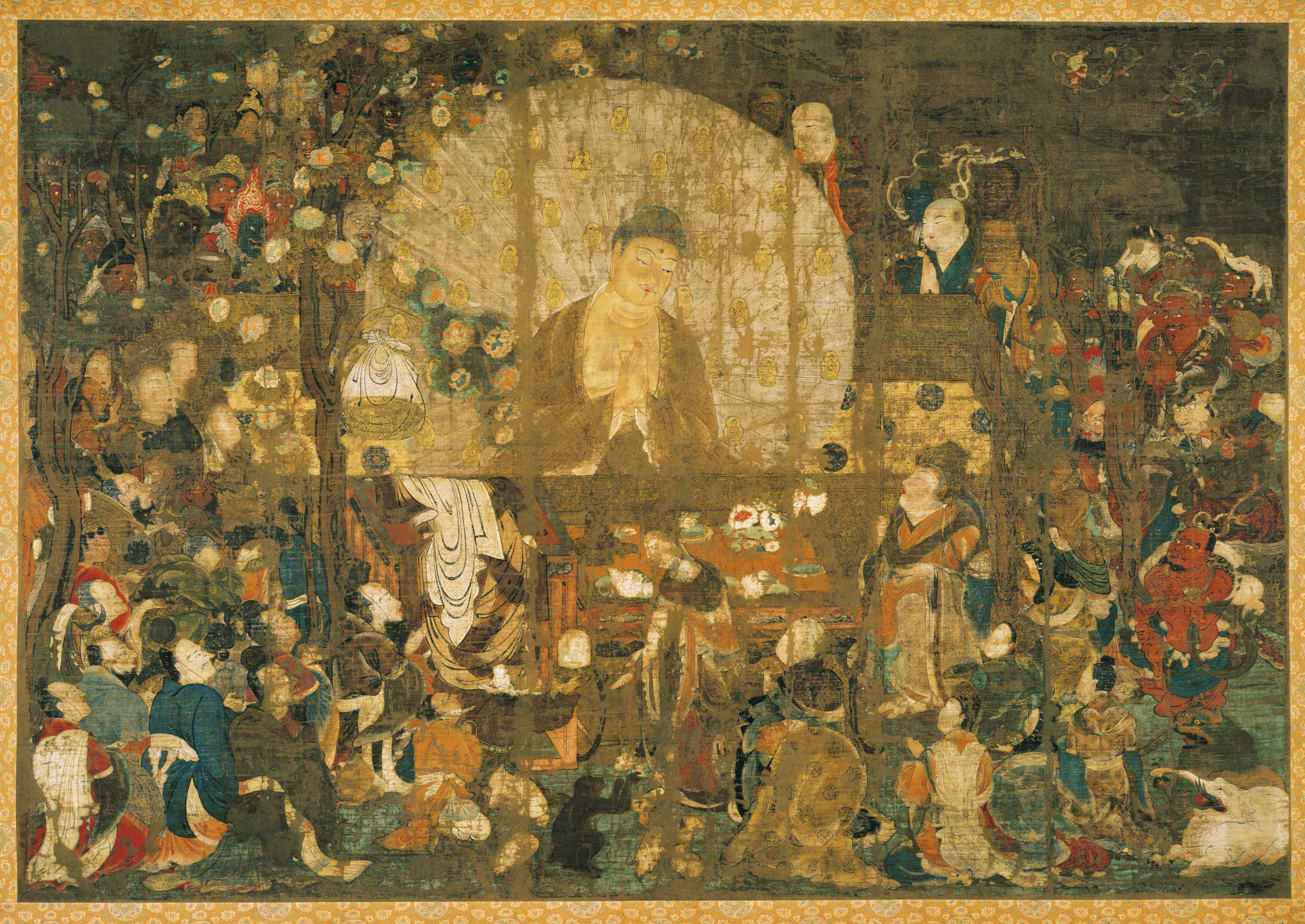
Śākyamuni's transcendent body arising from his golden tomb, 11th century Heian period Hanging scroll, Kyoto National Museum.

In contrast with early Buddhist views that emphasise the Buddha's struggle on the spiritual path, Mahāyāna scriptures, such as the Avataṃsaka Sūtra and Lotus Sūtra, portray Śākyamuni as already fully enlightened countless eons ago. Thus, his attainment under the Bodhi tree is also a didactic device (upaya), a demonstration for the sake of others rather than an actual personal breakthrough from delusion to awakening. This Śākyamuni who appeared to be born as a prince in the Śākya clan in India is understood to be a nirmāṇakāya, a docetic emanation. His apparent human birth, life, attainment of enlightenment, and death were skillful manifestations designed to teach and guide sentient beings, rather than literal events in the life of a finite being. The Mahāparinirvāṇa Sūtra reinforces this doctrine by denying that the Buddha truly enters parinirvāṇa. His apparent death is merely another teaching device. In fact, he remains eternally active, and his dharma-body (dharmakāya) continues to benefit beings. These texts collectively assert that the true Śākyamuni is eternal, unconditioned, and ever-present, even though he assumes various forms adapted to the spiritual capacities of those he teaches.

A central doctrinal framework for understanding Śākyamuni in Mahāyāna thought is the trikāya ("triple body") doctrine, which holds that Buddhas have a triune body: (1) Nirmāṇakāya ("emanation body"), the body which appears in the world, (2) Saṃbhogakāya ("enjoyment body"), a resplendent supranatural form, and (3) Dharmakāya, the formless body of ultimate reality. Through this framework, the "historical" Śākyamuni is not merely a historical teacher, but a cosmic being whose appearance on earth is but one of countless manifestations. His true identity is that of the saṃbhoga- and dharmakāyas, which extend beyond the limits of space and time. Not limited to a single location or lifespan, his bodies permeate the entire cosmos, appearing in innumerable worlds. In this view, the universe itself is Śākyamuni's pure land, gradually being purified and transformed through his spiritual presence and teaching. This aligns with Mahāyāna cosmology in which Buddhas are not absent from the world and never abandon it due to their great compassion.

== In other religions ==
=== Hinduism ===
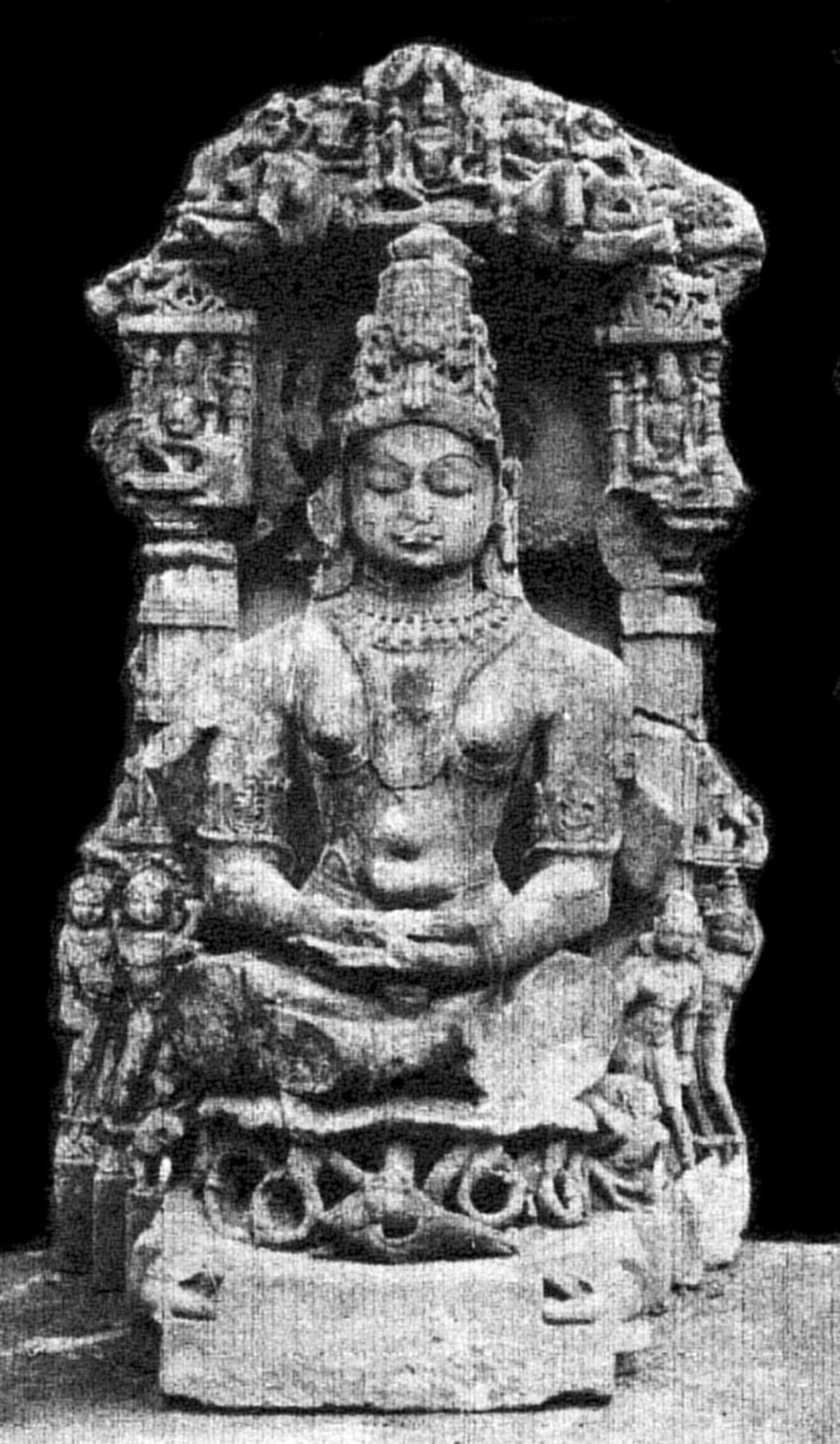
Buddha incarnation of Vishnu, from Sunari, Medieval period. Gujari Mahal Archaeological Museum

After the lifetime of the Buddha the Hindu synthesis emerged, between 500–200 BCE and c. 300 CE, under the pressure of the success of Buddhism and Jainism. In response to the success of Buddhism, Gautama was incorporated into Vaishnavism as the 9th avatar of Vishnu. (Note: This belief is not universally held as Krishna is held to be the ninth avatar in some traditions and his half-brother Balarama the eight.) The adoption of the Buddha as an incarnation began at approximately the same time as Hinduism began to predominate and Buddhism to decline in India, and the inclusion is ambiguous, as the co-option into a list of avatars may be seen as an aspect of Hindu efforts to decisively weaken Buddhist power and appeal in India. While his inclusion has been rejected by some traditionalists, many modern Hindus include the Buddha in their conception of Hinduism.

Buddha's teachings deny the authority of the Vedas and the concepts of Brahman-Atman. Consequently, Buddhism is generally classified as a nāstika school (heterodox, literally "It is not so" (Note: "in Sanskrit philosophical literature, 'āstika' means 'one who believes in the authority of the Vedas', 'soul', 'Brahman'. ('nāstika' means the opposite of these).)) in contrast to the six orthodox schools of Hinduism.

=== Christianity ===
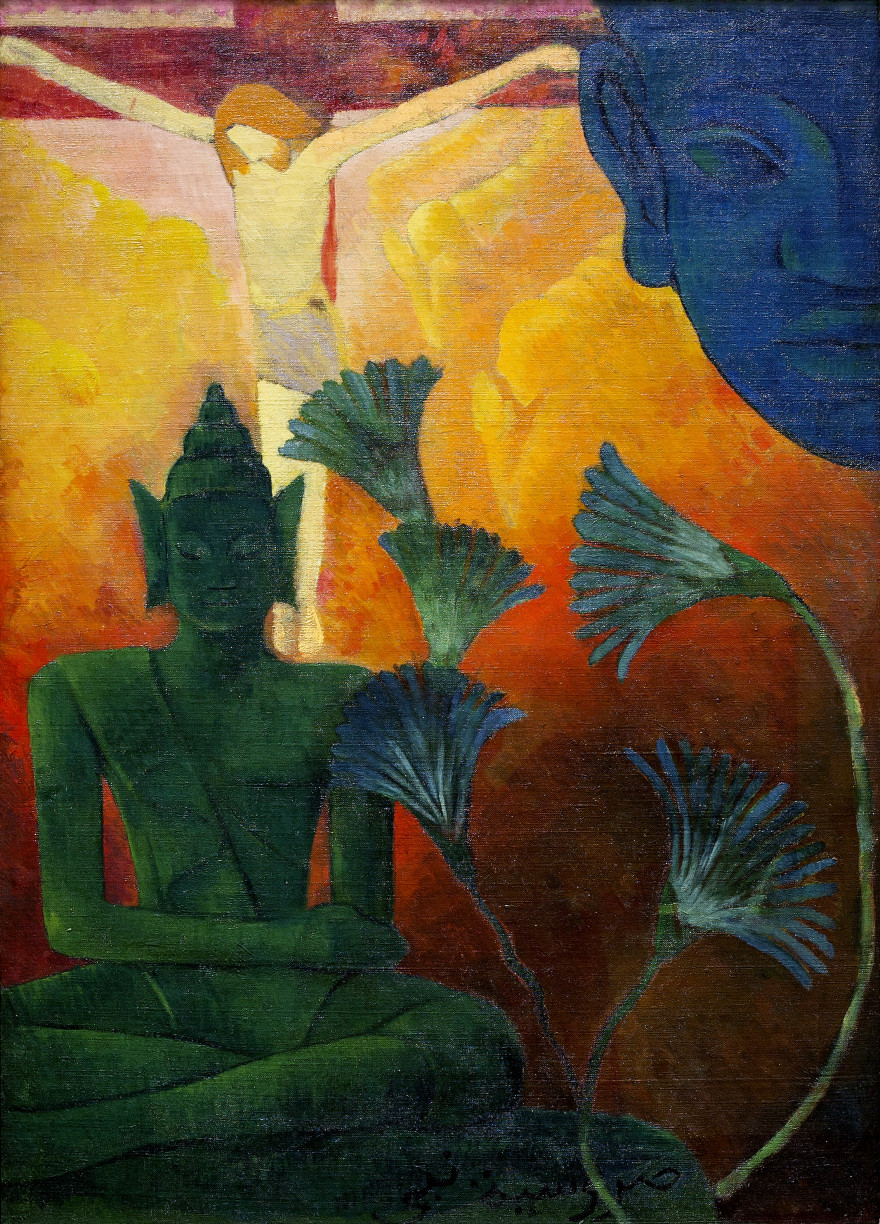
Christ and Buddha by Paul Ranson, 1880

The Christian saint Josaphat is based on the Buddha. The name comes from the Sanskrit Bodhisattva via Arabic Būdhasaf and Georgian Iodasaph. The only story in which St. Josaphat appears, Barlaam and Josaphat, is based on the life of the Buddha. Josaphat was included in earlier editions of the Roman Martyrology (feast-day 27 November)—though not in the Roman Missal—and in the Eastern Orthodox Church liturgical calendar (26 August).

=== Islam ===
Buddhist ideas in Muslim culture can be traced to the presence of Buddhism in Transoxiana and K̲h̲urāsān. Buddhism lasted from the 2nd century B.C. to the 8th century, there, until it dwindled in the face of Zoroastrianism, the Sassanid state religion. Remnants of Buddhism remained until the 9th century and the lasting impact of Buddhist influence is reflected in Muslim arts and poetry of Islamic Persia. However, in the 9th century, the intellectual distance between Buddhism and Islam increased drastically. Only centuries later, during Turco-Mongol governance, the attention of Muslim scholars shifted towards Buddhism again.

In Islamic sources, Buddha is called Budd (Persian: but) or Shakyamuni. The former term is used in the writings of al-Jahiz, al-Mas'udi, al-Biruni, and al-Shahrastani. The term further denotes a temple or an idol, as many authors believed that Buddhists were idolaters. They are described further as believing in the eternity of the world, the retributation of actions after life, and the appearance of Buddha in various forms. Buddhists were referred to as sumaniyya.

Although Muslims had only rudimentary knowledge about Buddhism, they attempted to integrate the Buddha into their own religious history. Ibn Hazm defines the Buddha as a person who is not born, does not eat or drink, and does not die. The Buddha is compared to various Islamic figures by Muslim heresiologists. In his Fihrist, ibn al-Nadim reiterates three opinions from among the scholars, that the Buddha is either an angel, an ʿifrīt (demon), or a Prophet. Al-Shahrastani identified Buddha with al-Khizr.

Rashid al-Din Hamadani's (1247–1318) Jāmiʿ al-Tawārīkh dedicates an entire chapter on describing Buddhist beliefs to the Ilkhanate from a Muslim viewpoint. He identifies Buddha (Shakyamuni) as a monotheistic prophet. He integrates the cyclical reappearance of the Buddha into the lineage of Islamic prophets, who likewise raise whenever a community yielded into decay and violence. In line with Islamic prophetology, Rashid al-Din emphasises the finality of Muhammad. In order to establish Buddha's monotheism, the author retells a story from the Lalitavistara Sūtra within an Islamic framework: Accordingly, the Indian deities, Vishnu, Brahma, Shiva, and Indra are prophets or angels who claim divinity for themselves and thus identified with the "people of Iblis" (ahl-i iblīs). When Buddha is brought to the idols and ordered to worship them, the idols bow down before Buddha instead, an idea linked to the Quranic story of angels prostrating before Adam, and the superiority of prophets over angels in Islamic theology (Kalām).

Muhammad Hamidullah (1908 – December 2002) identifies Buddha as a prophet based on the Quran Surah 95:1. The verse takes an oath by a fig-tree, followed by Mount Sinai. Since Moses received his revelation on Mount Sinai, the fig-tree features as the location of revelation for another prophet, identified with Buddha, since Buddha reached enlightenment under a fig-tree. He is further identified with the prophet Dhu al-Kifl, supposedly related to his birthplace in Kapila-Vastu. He furthermore compares Buddha's teachings with that of Muhammad: The teaching of the omnipresence of dukkha, as formulated in the Four Noble Truths, is compared to 90:04, stating that "humans are created in "pain toil and trial"". Similarly, by receiving his revelation, Muhammad would have entered into a state of peace (salam) and, as per hadith, his devilish nature surrendered to islam (aslama shayṭānī).

=== Other religions ===
In the Baháʼí Faith, the Buddha is regarded as one of the Manifestations of God.

Some early Chinese Taoist-Buddhists thought the Buddha to be a reincarnation of Laozi.

In the ancient Gnostic sect of Manichaeism, the Buddha is listed among the prophets who preached the word of God before Mani.

In Sikhism, Buddha is mentioned as the 23rd avatar of Vishnu in the Chaubis Avtar, a composition in Dasam Granth traditionally and historically attributed to Guru Gobind Singh.

== Artistic depictions ==
The earliest artistic depictions of the Buddha found at Bharhut and Sanchi are aniconic and symbolic. During this early aniconic period, the Buddha is depicted by other objects or symbols, such as an empty throne, a riderless horse, footprints, a Dharma wheel or a Bodhi tree. Since aniconism precludes single devotional figures, most representations are of narrative scenes from his life. These continued to be very important after the Buddha's person could be shown, alongside larger statues. The art at Sanchi also depicts Jataka tales, narratives of the Buddha in his past lives.

Other styles of Indian Buddhist art depict the Buddha in human form, either standing, sitting crossed legged (often in the Lotus Pose) or lying down on one side. Iconic representations of the Buddha became particularly popular and widespread after the first century CE. Some of these depictions, particularly those of Gandharan Buddhism and Central Asian Buddhism, were influenced by Hellenistic art, a style known as Greco-Buddhist art. The subsequently influenced the art of East Asian Buddhist images, as well as those of Southeast Asian Theravada Buddhism.

=== Gallery showing different Buddha styles ===
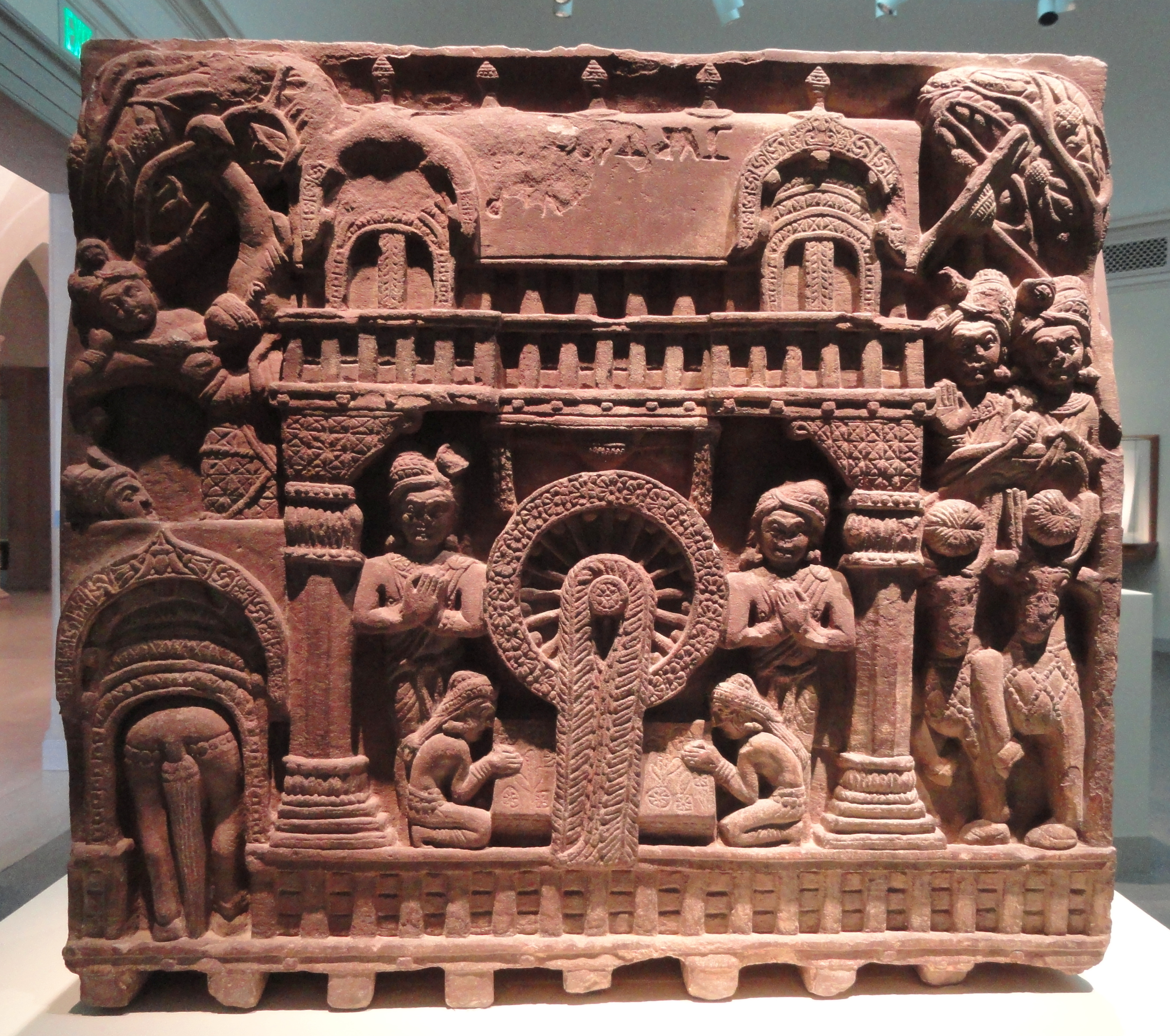
A Royal Couple Visiting the Buddha, railing relief from the Bharhut Stupa, Shunga dynasty, early 2nd century BCE.

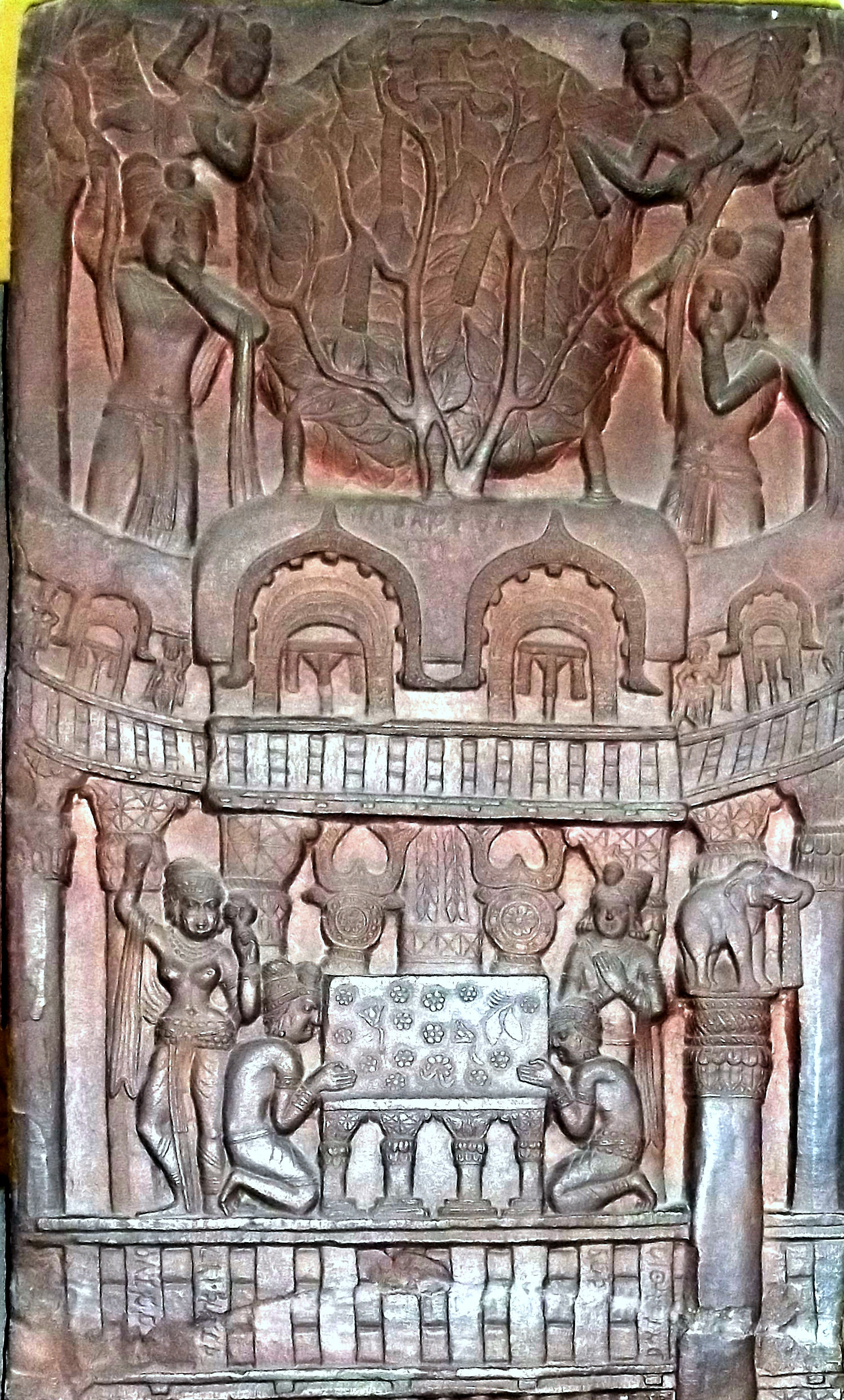
Adoration of the Diamond Throne and the Bodhi Tree, Bharhut.

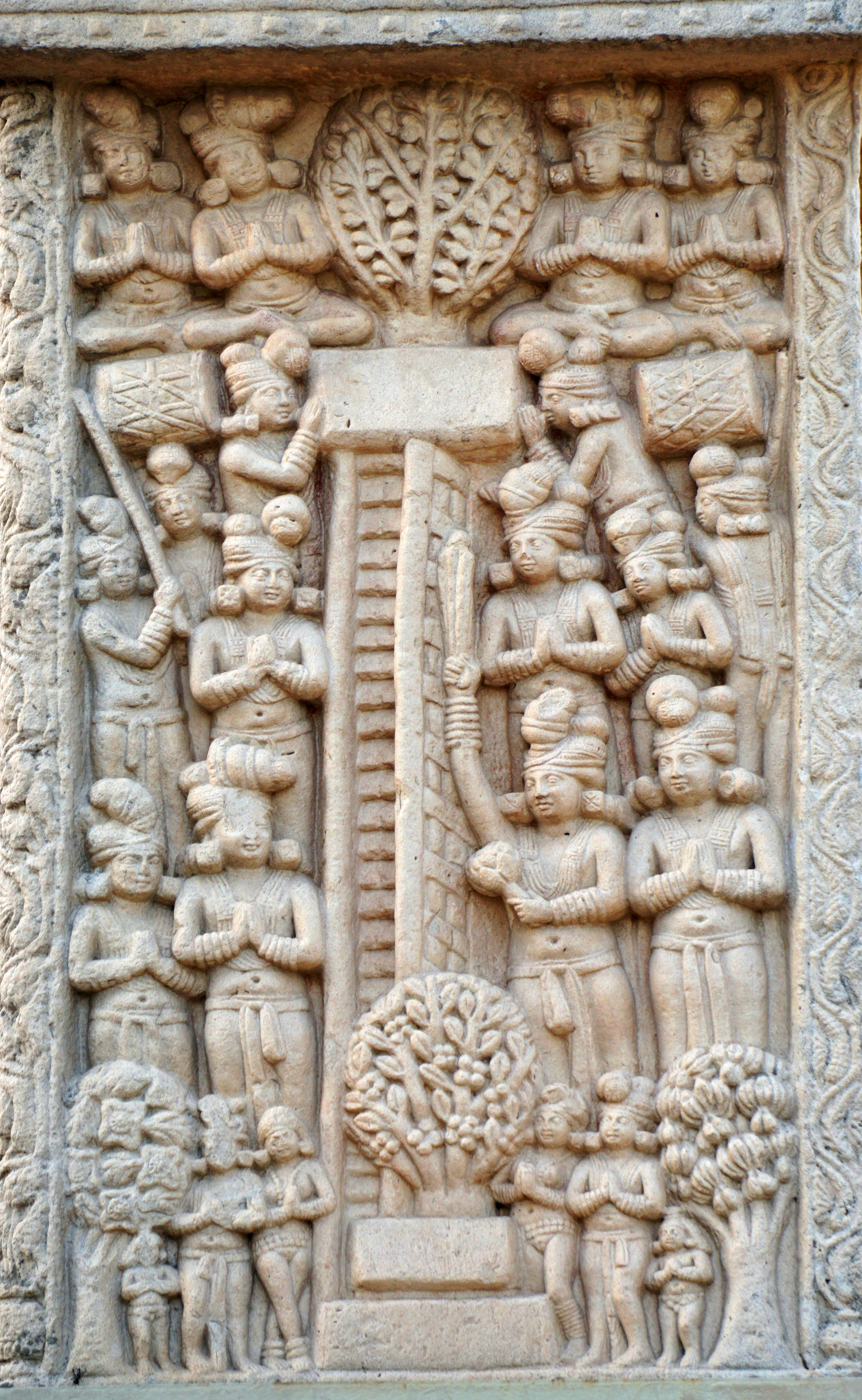
Descent of the Buddha from the Trayastrimsa Heaven, Sanchi Stupa No. 1.

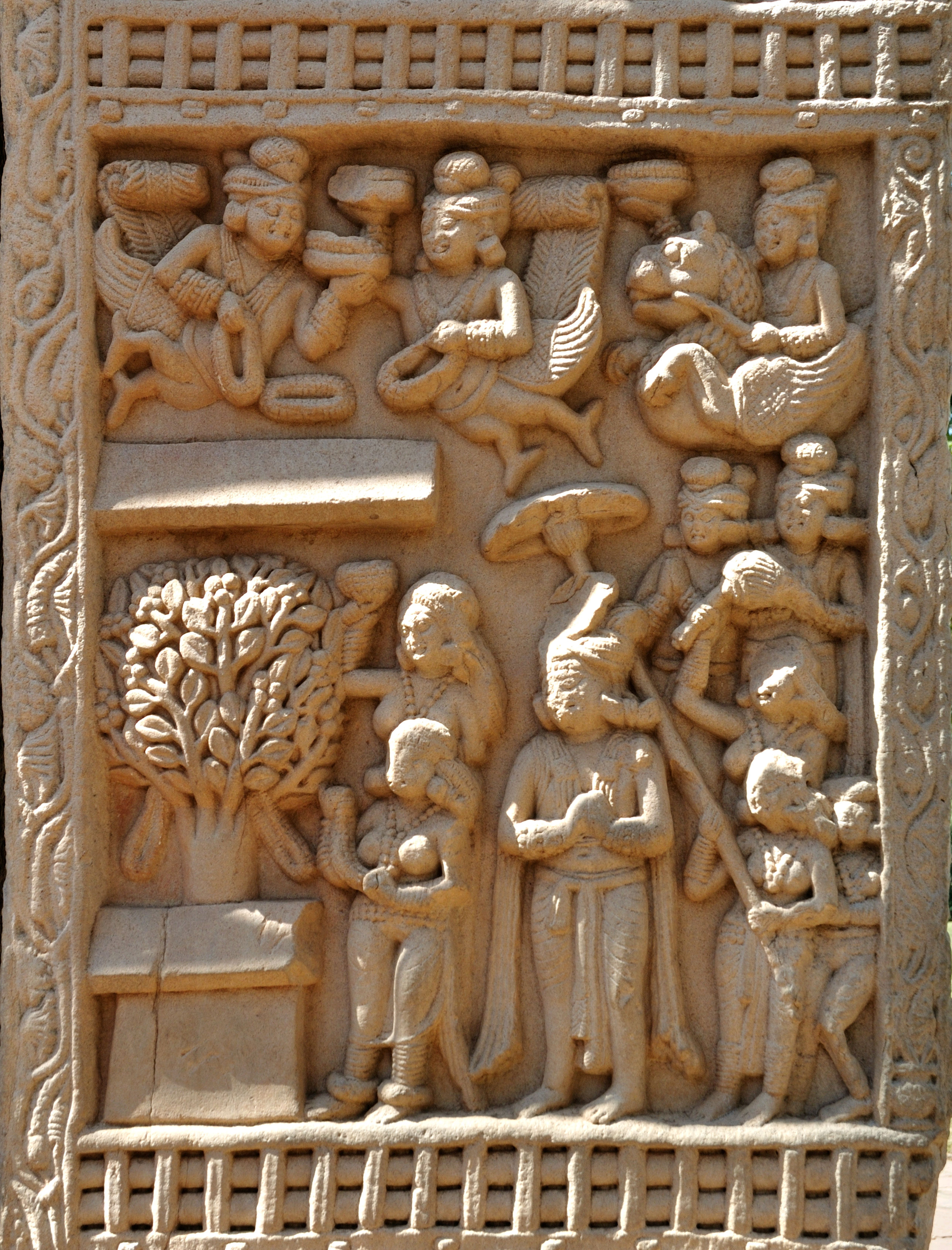
The Buddha's Miracle at Kapilavastu, Sanchi Stupa 1.

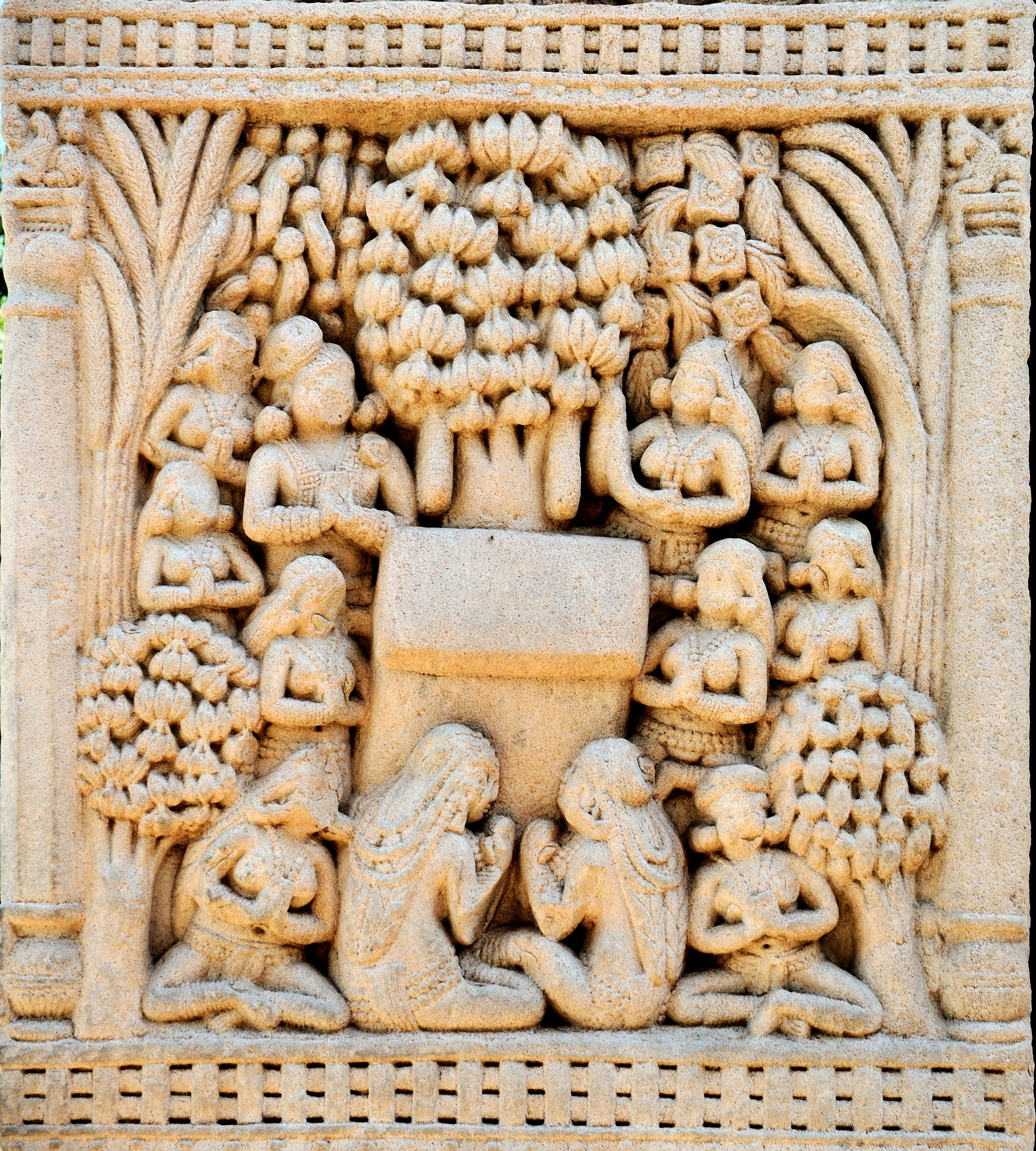
Bimbisara visiting the Buddha (represented as empty throne) at the Bamboo garden in Rajagriha

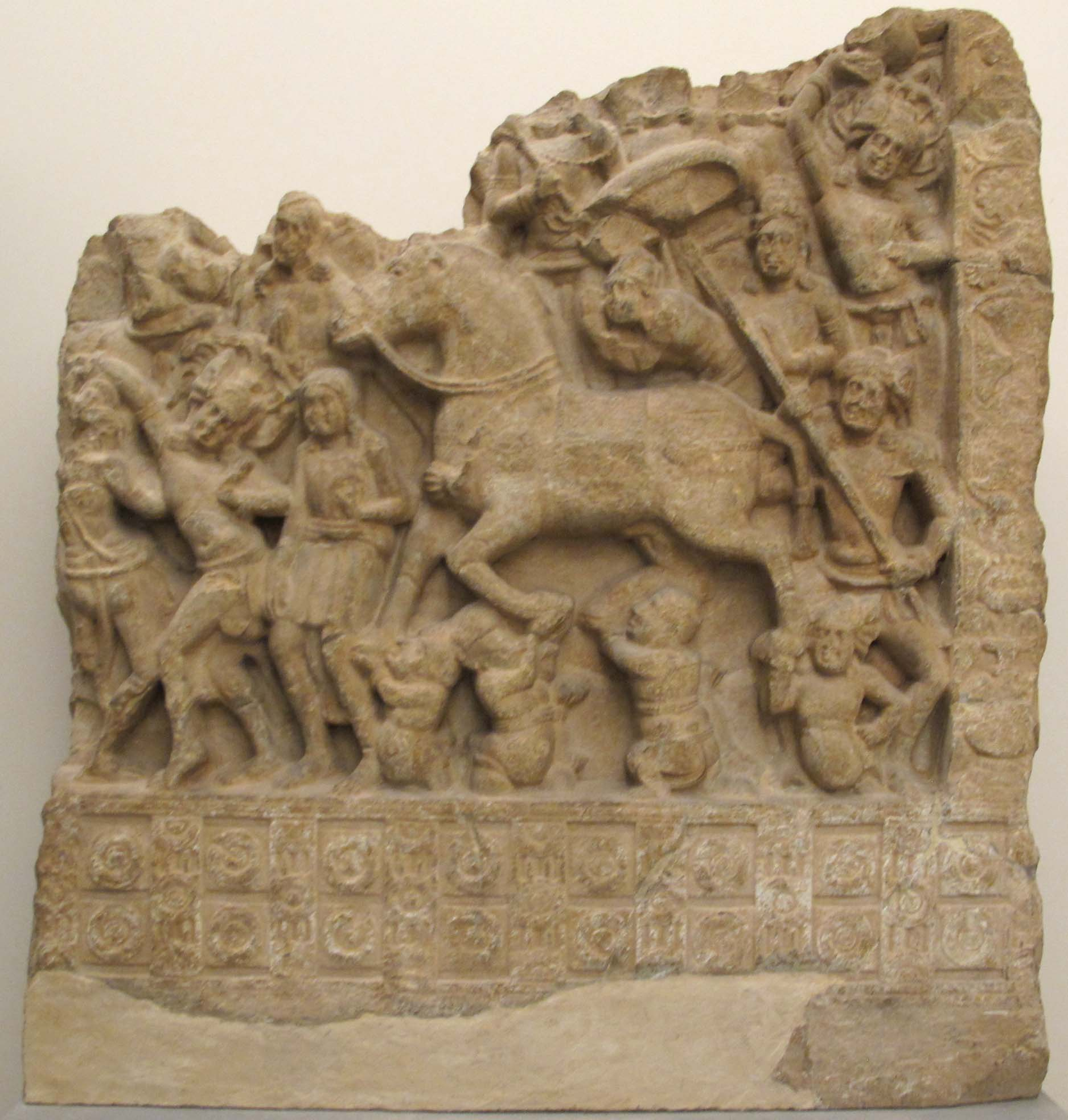
The great departure with riderless horse, Amaravati, 2nd century CE.

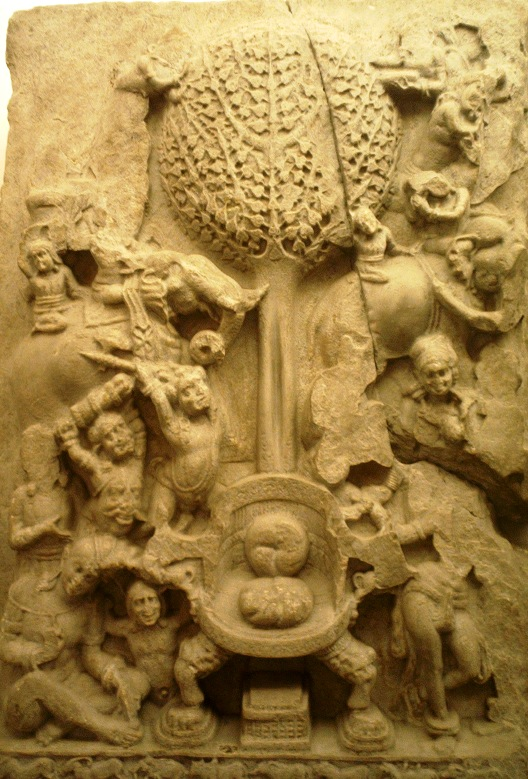
The Assault of Mara, Amaravati, 2nd century CE.

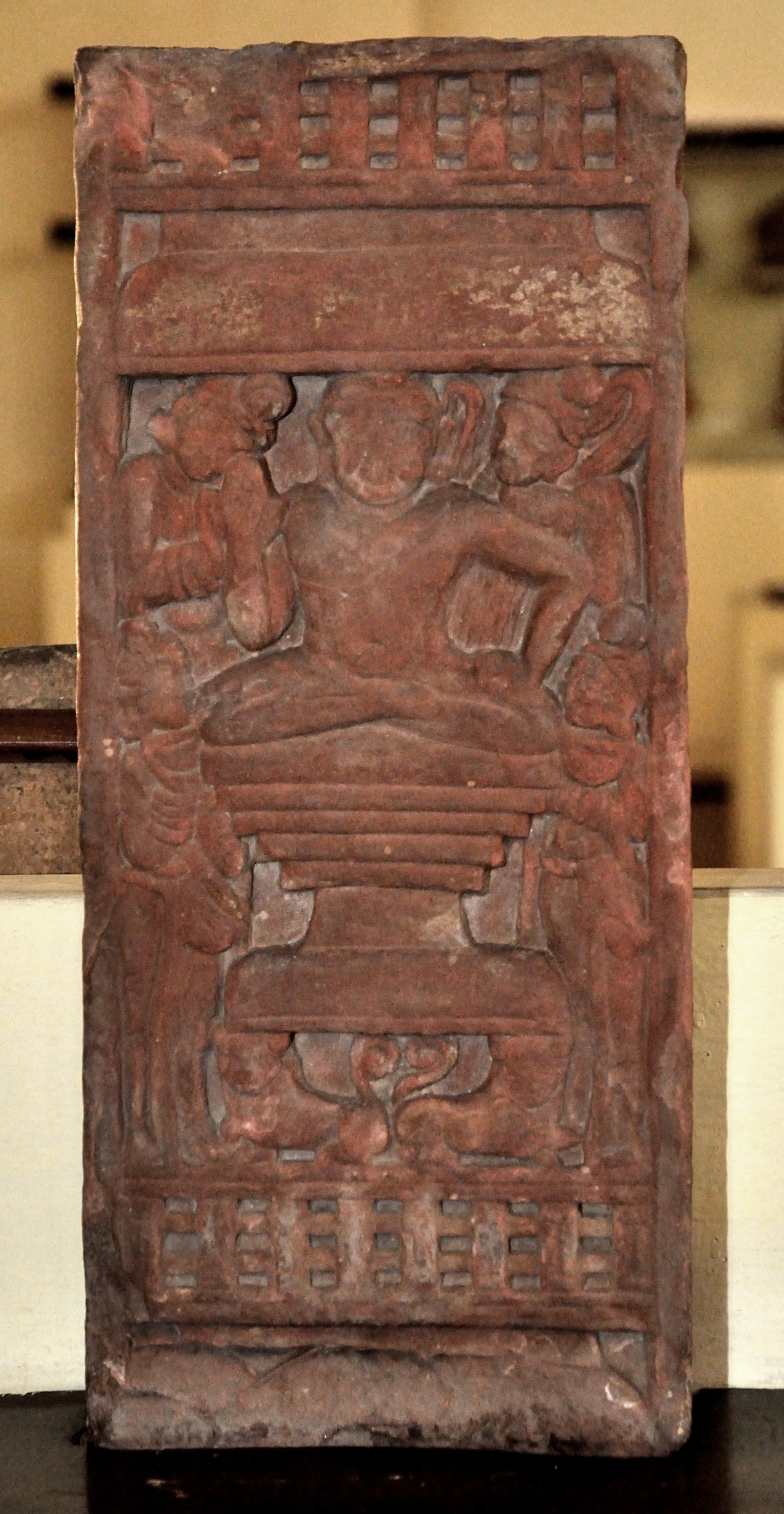
Isapur Buddha, one of the earliest physical depictions of the Buddha, c. 15 CE. Art of Mathura

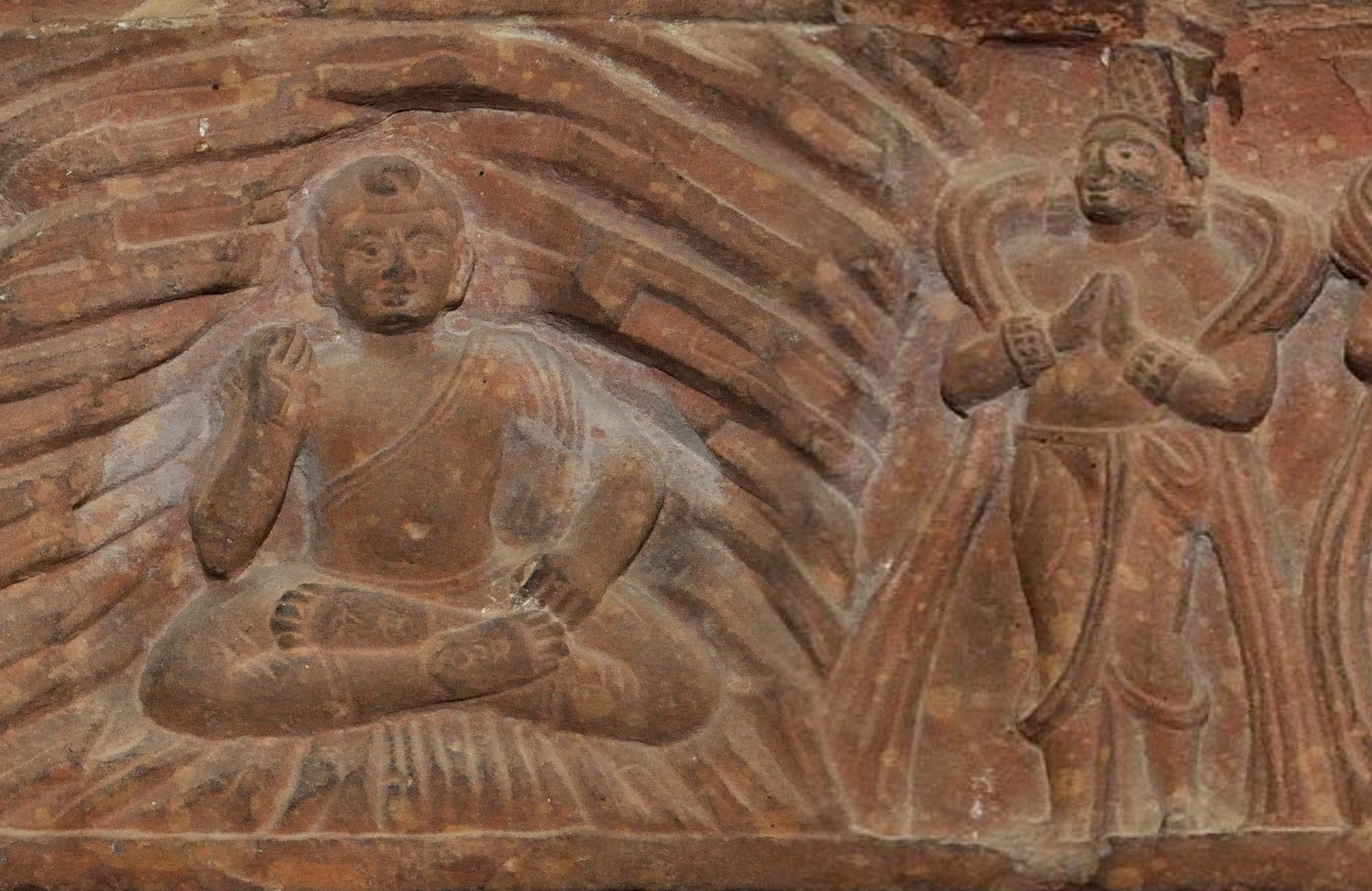
The Buddha attended by Indra at Indrasala Cave, Mathura 50–100 CE.

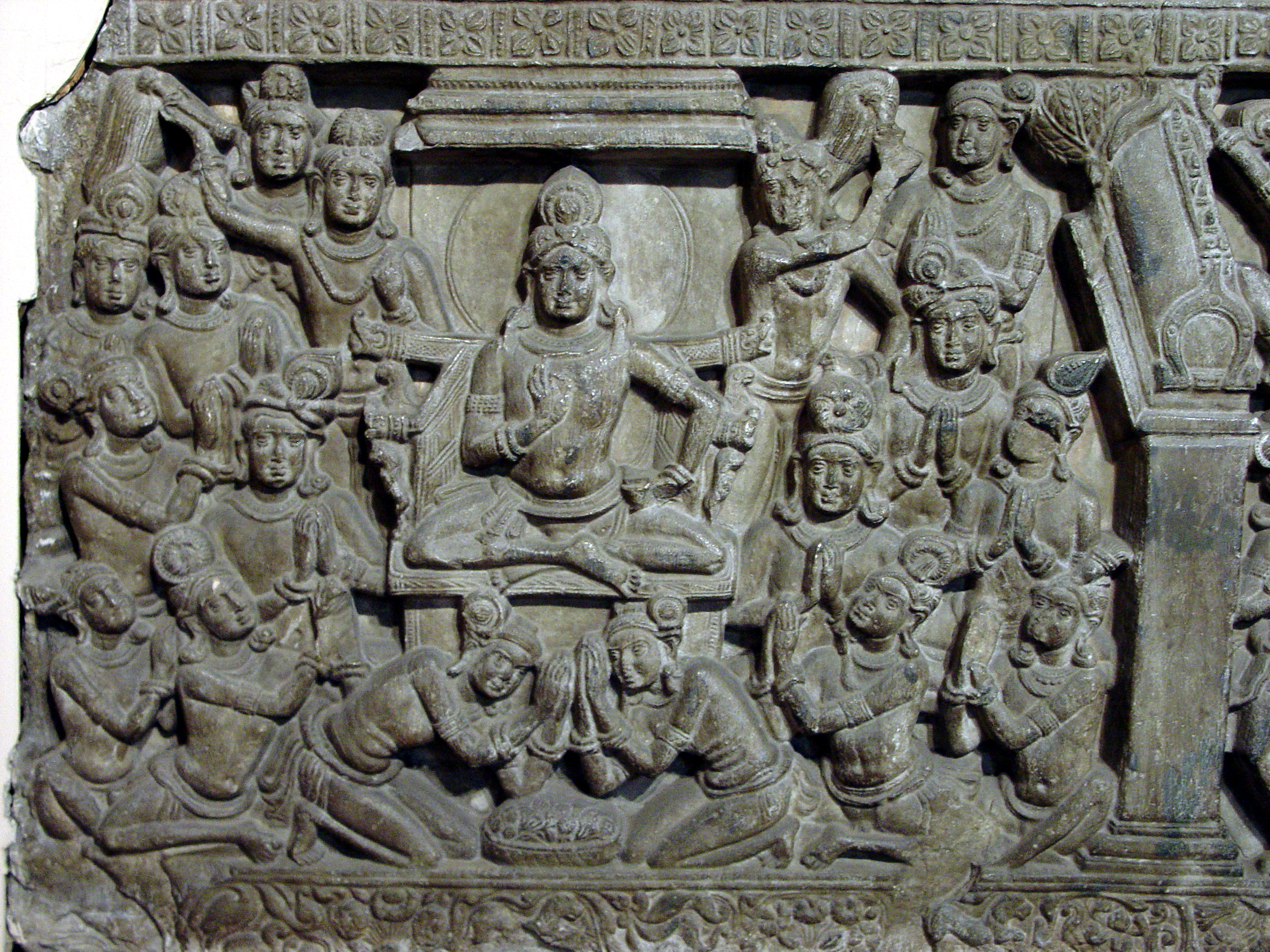
Buddha Preaching in Tushita Heaven. Amaravati, Satavahana period, 2nd century CE. Indian Museum, Kolkata.

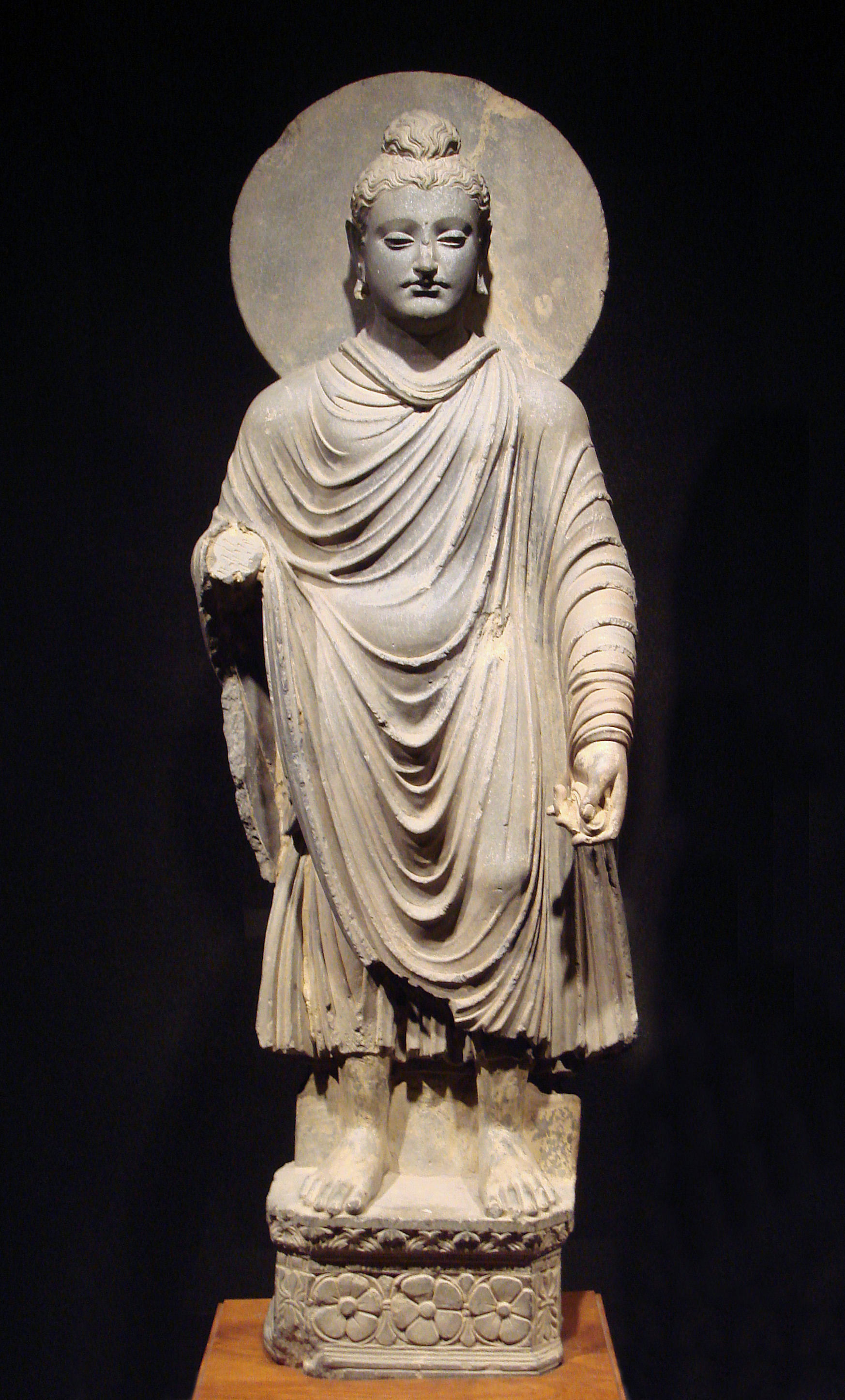
Standing Buddha from Gandhara.

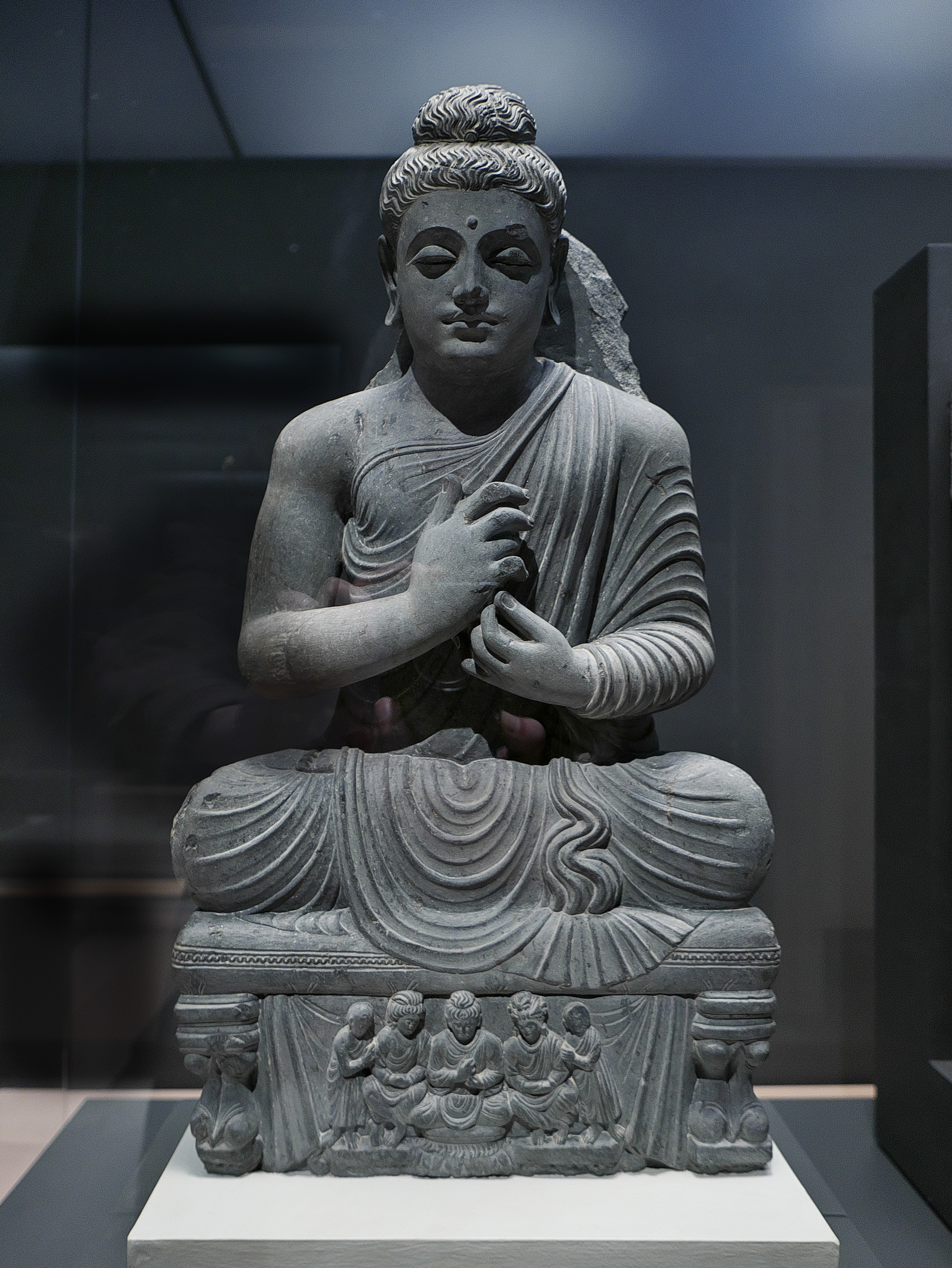
Seated Buddha from Gandhara.

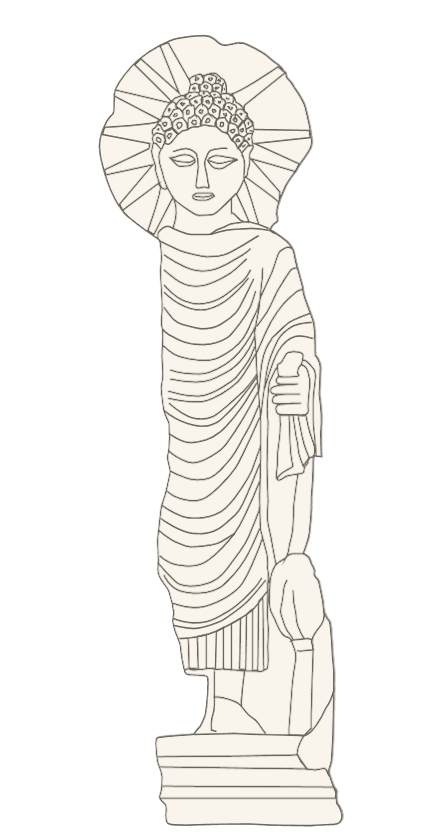
The Berenike Buddha, discovered in Berenice, Egypt, 2nd century CE.

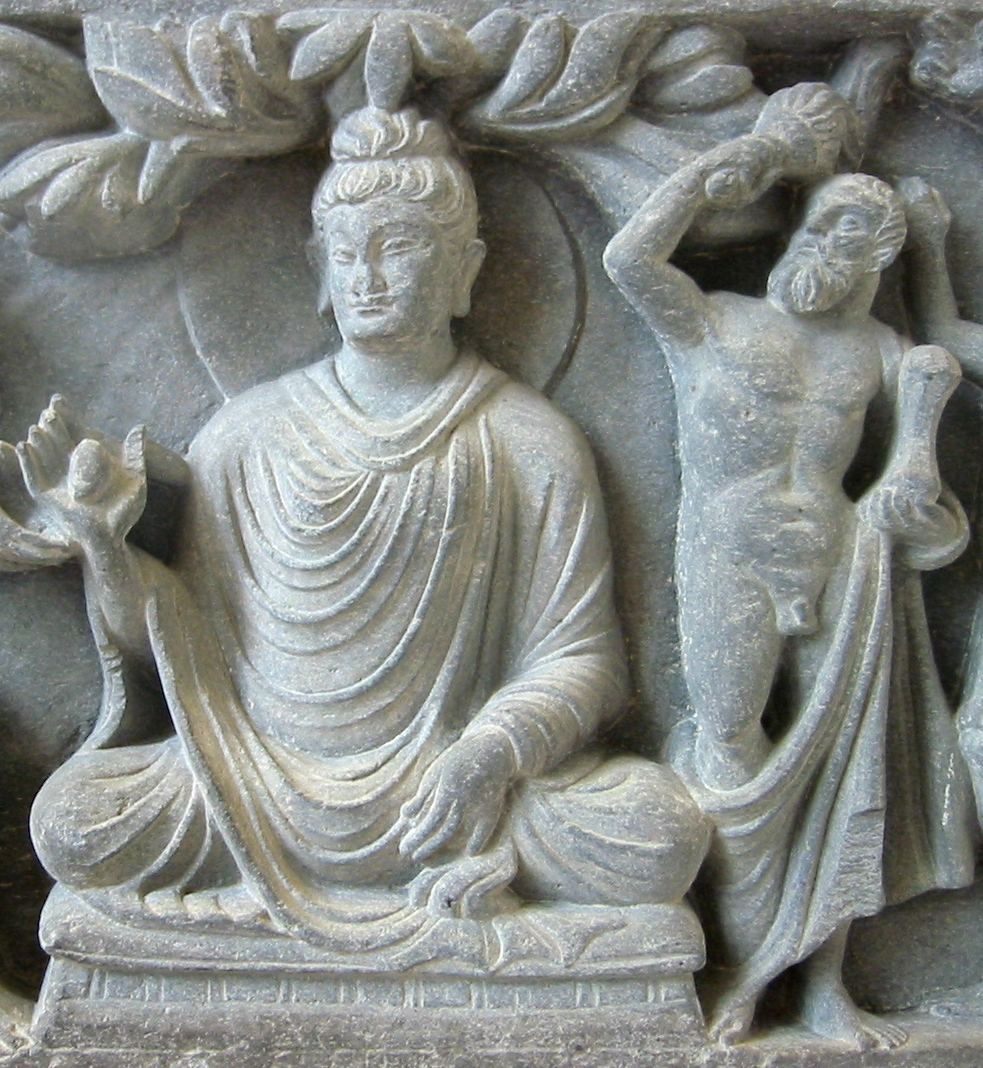
Gandharan Buddha with Vajrapani-Herakles.

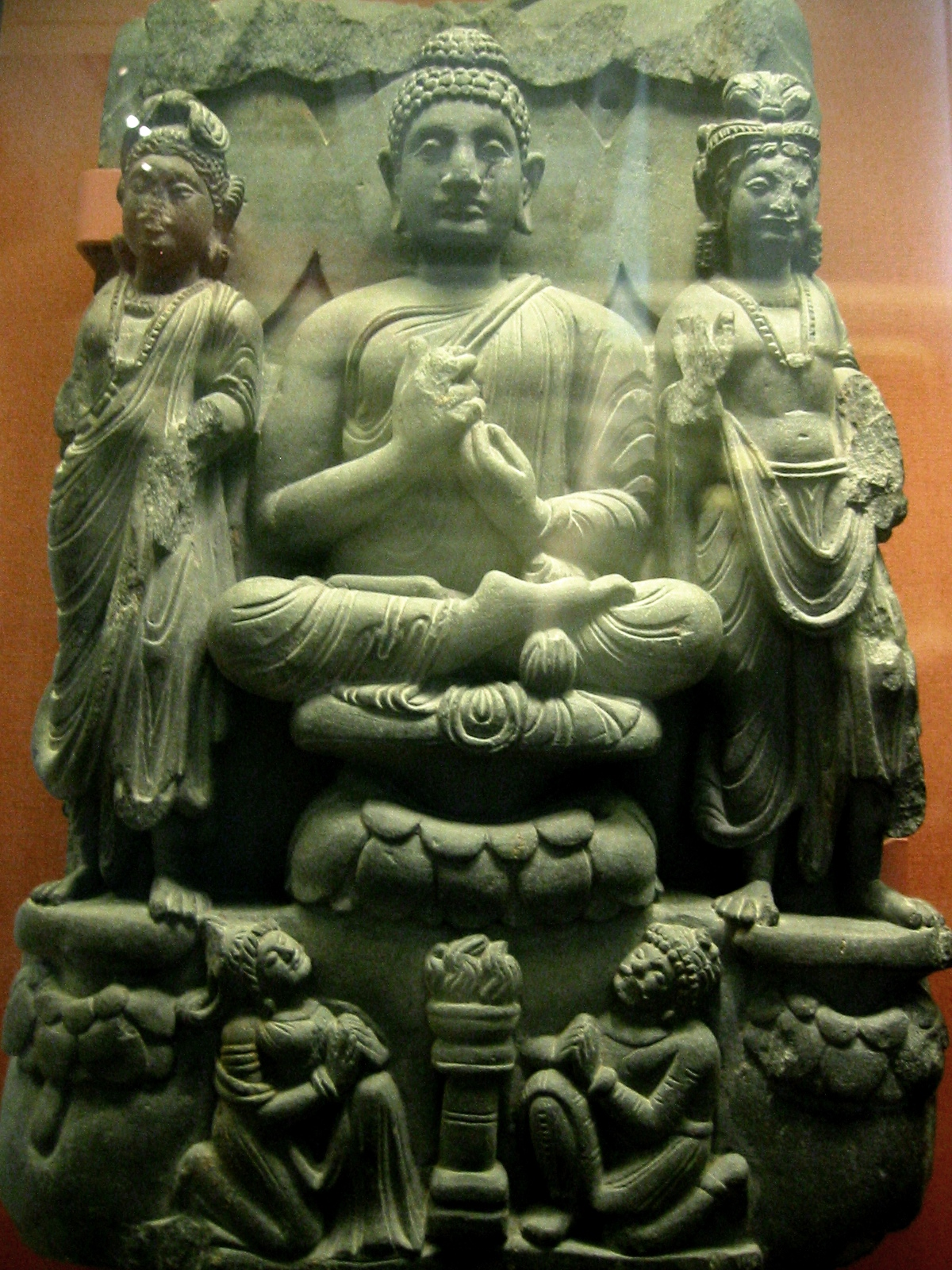
Kushan period Buddha Triad.

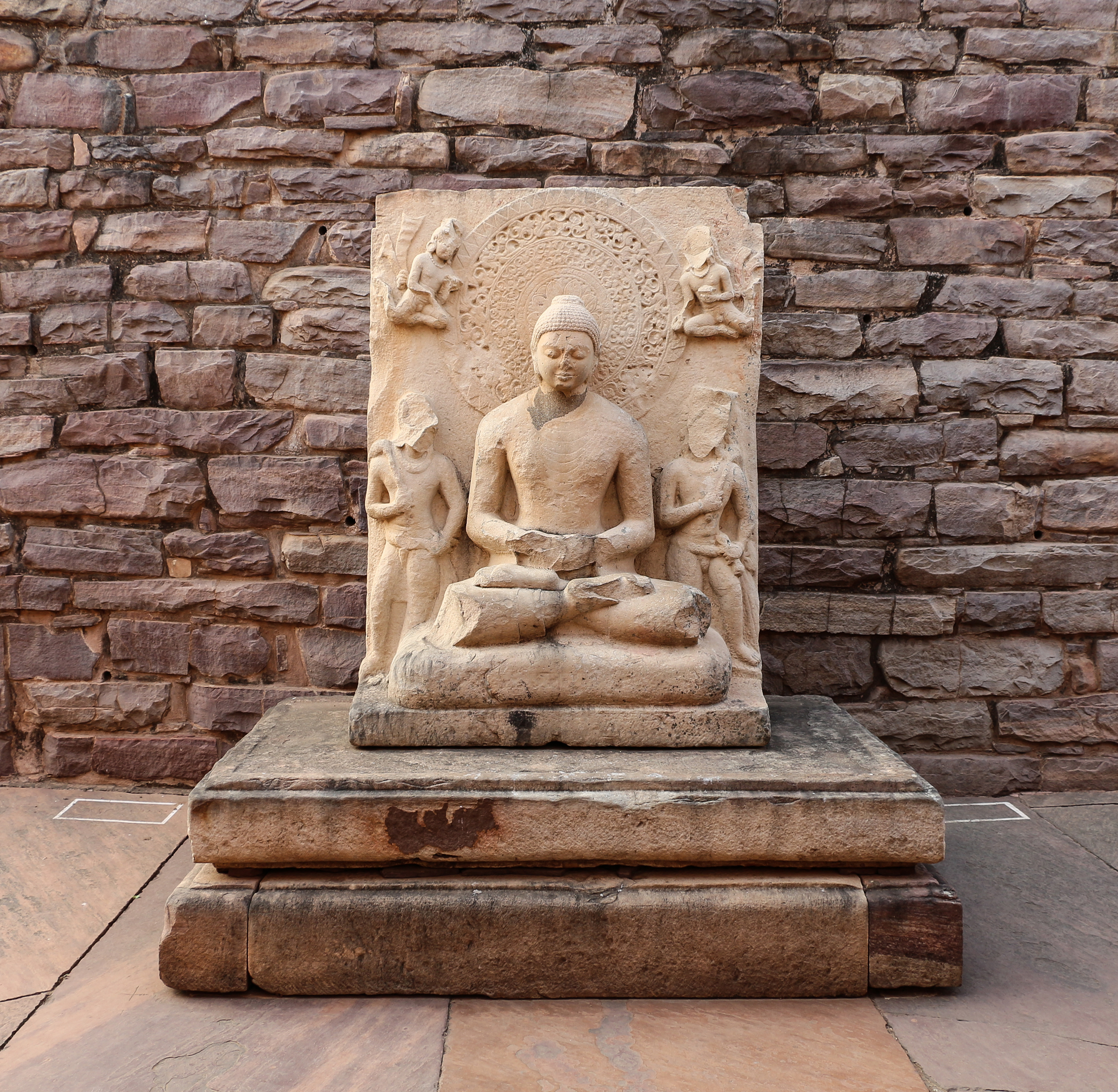
Buddha statue from Sanchi.

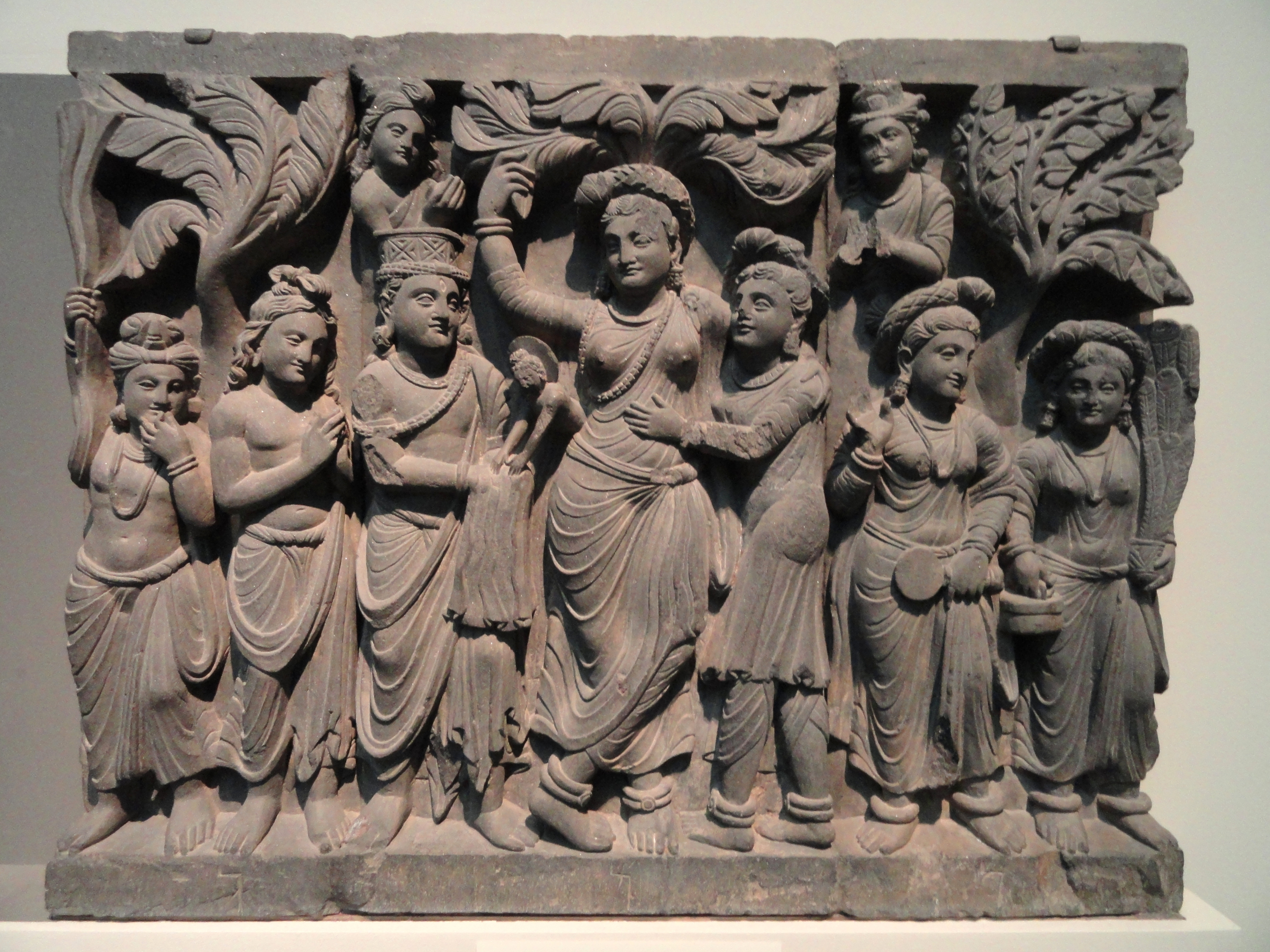
Birth of the Buddha, Kushan dynasty, late 2nd to early 3rd century CE.

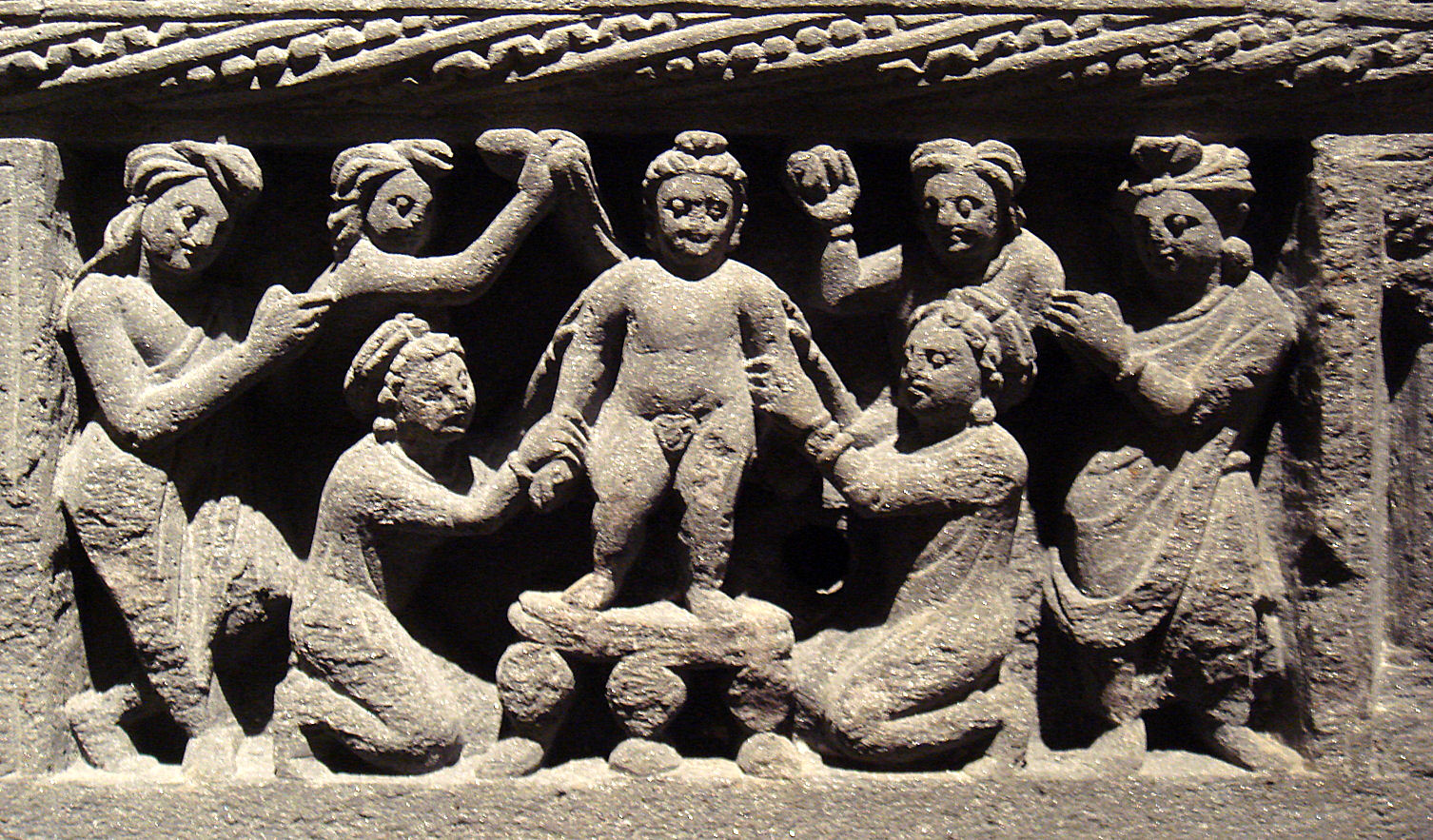
The infant Buddha taking a bath, Gandhara 2nd century CE.

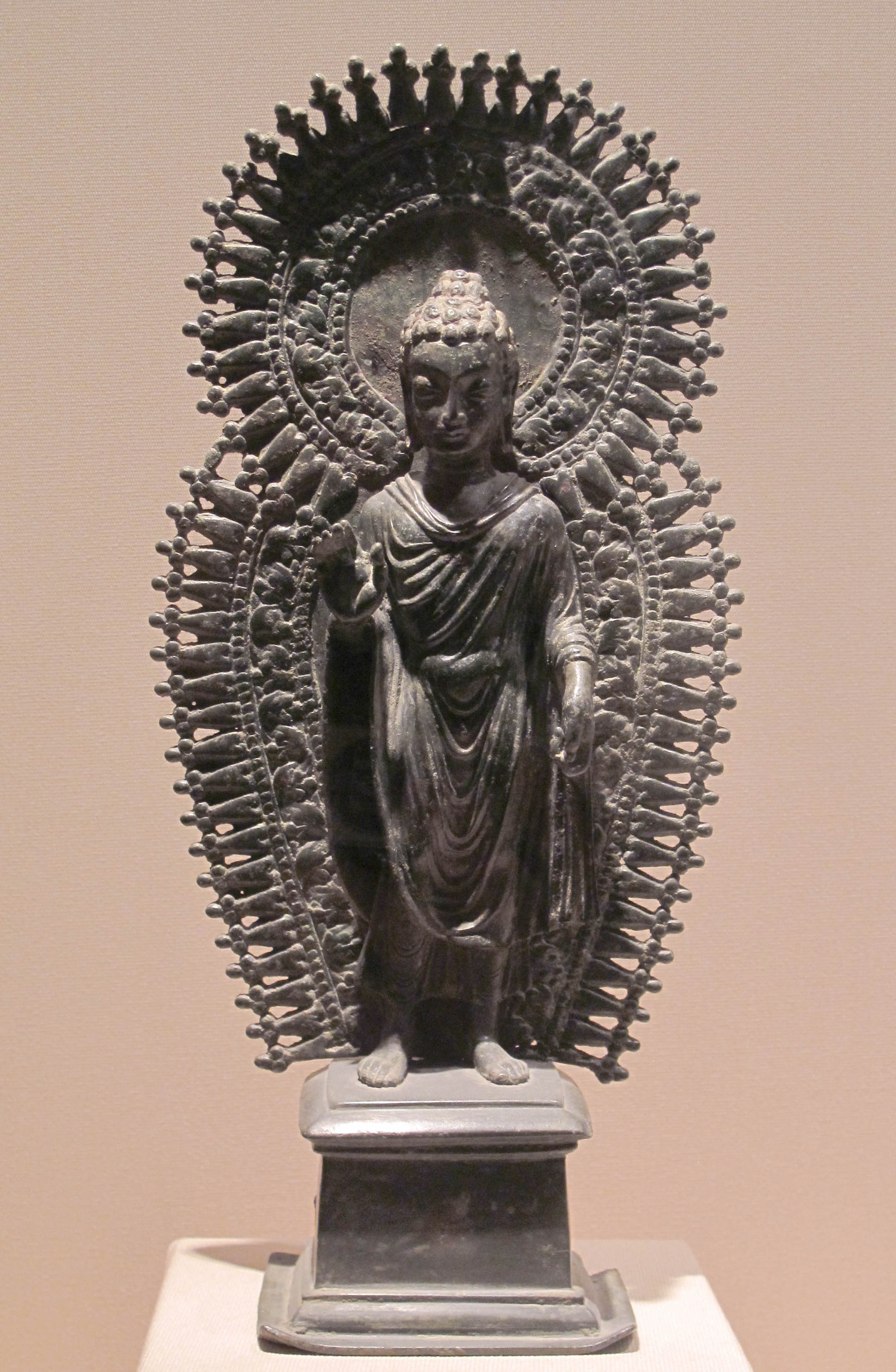
6th century Gandharan Buddha.

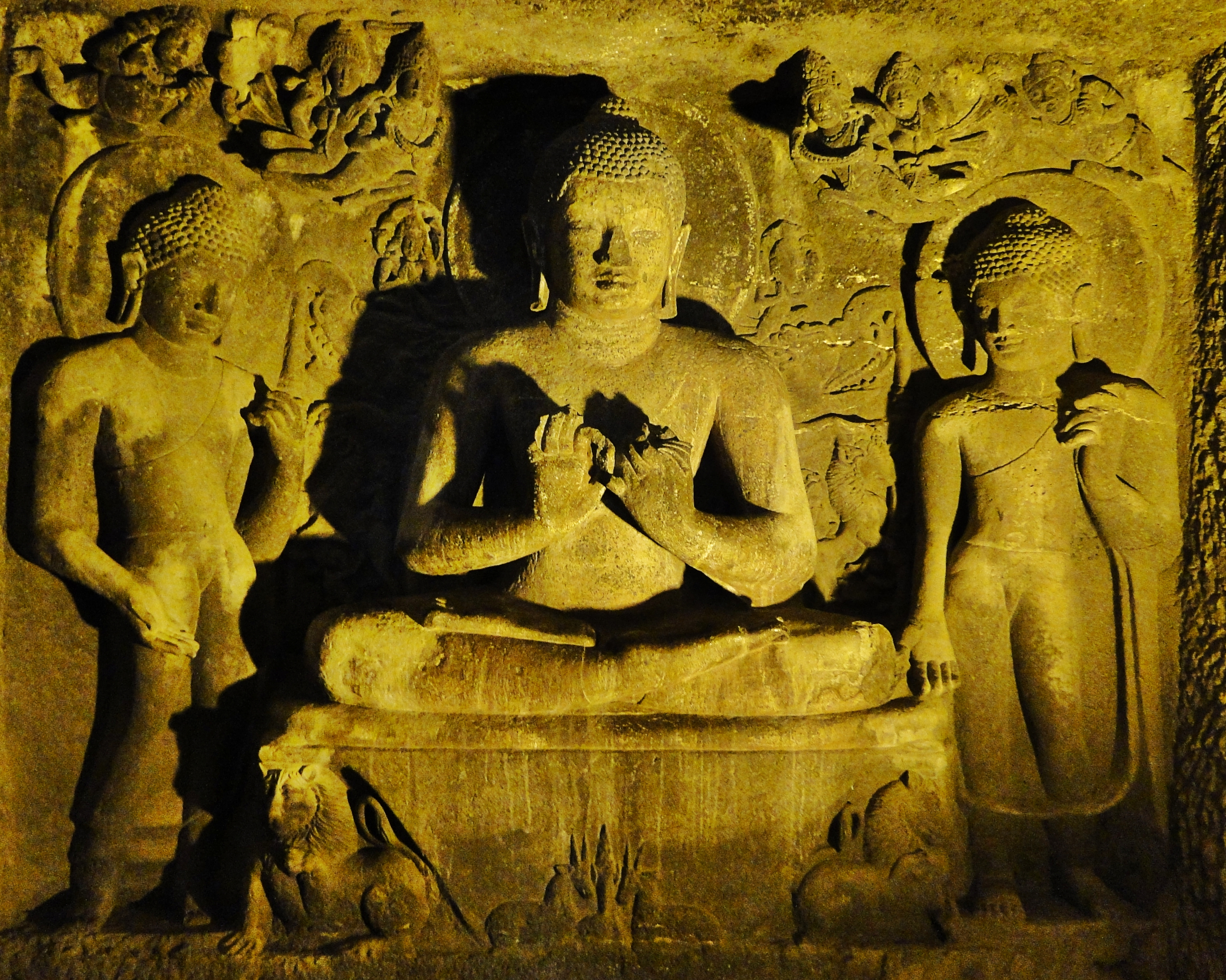
Buddha at Cave No. 6, Ajanta Caves.

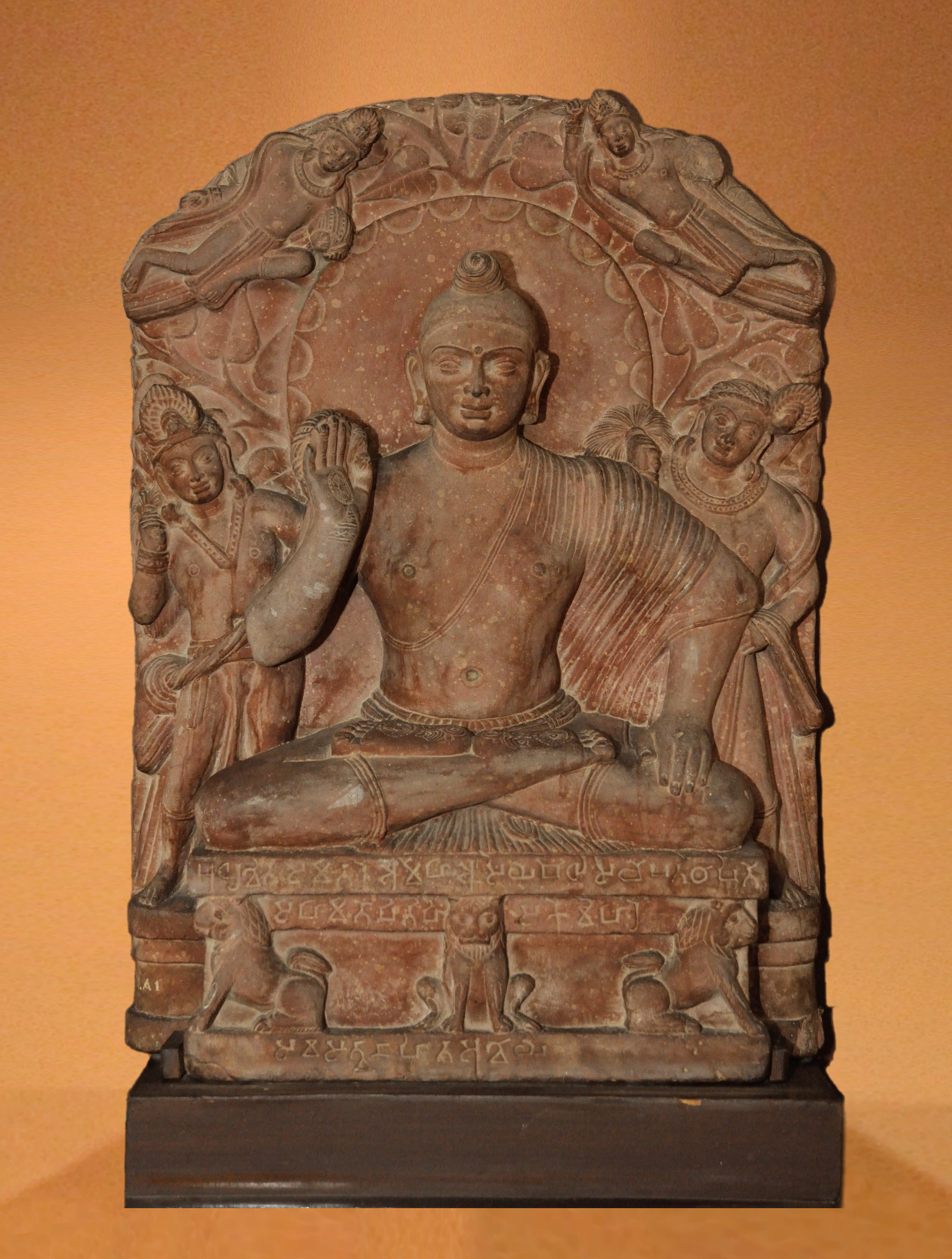
Seated Bodhisattva Shakyamuni in Abhaya mudra, with inscription "Amoha-asi (...) erected this Bodhisattva". Northern Satraps, end of 1st century CE.

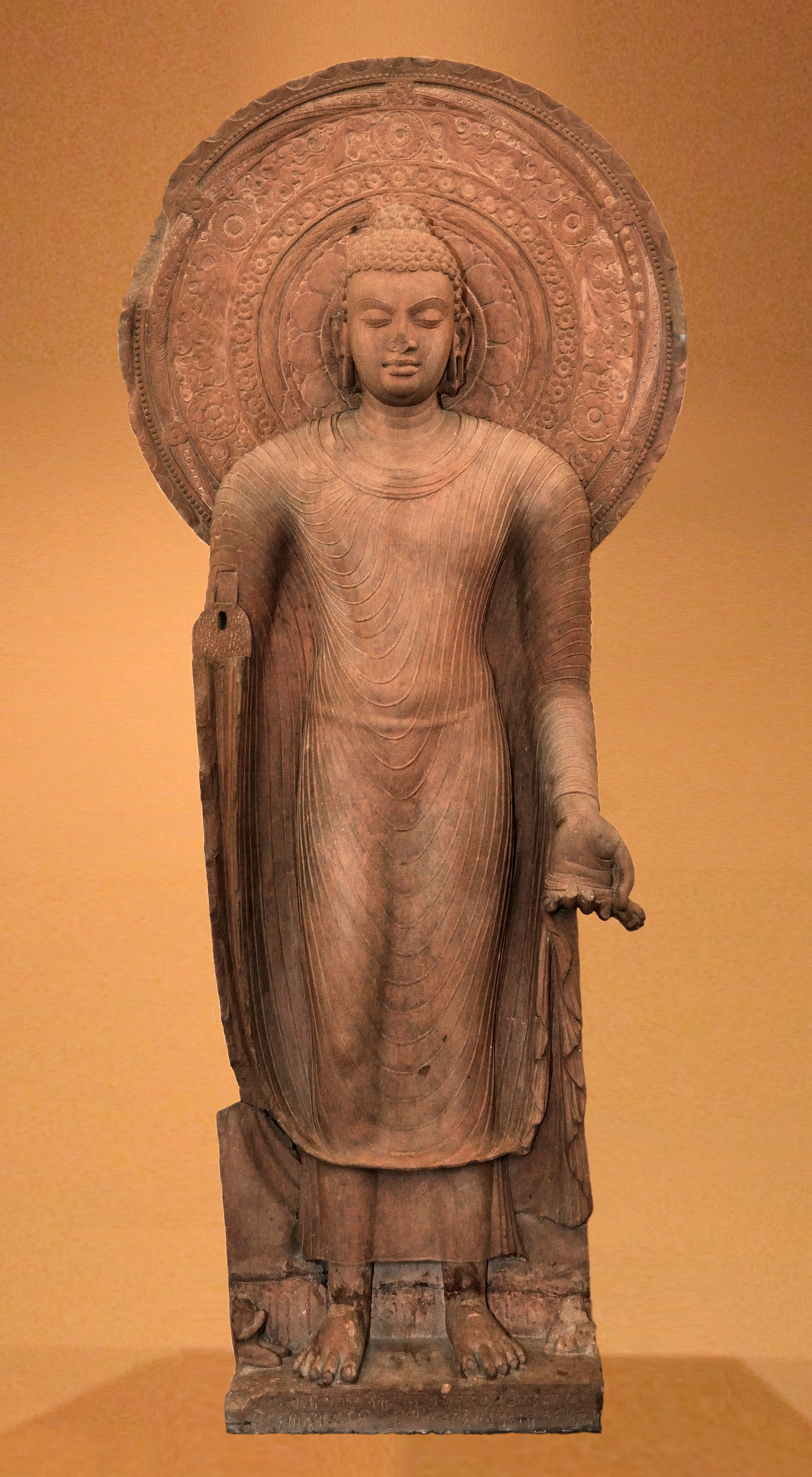
Standing Buddha, c. 5th century CE.

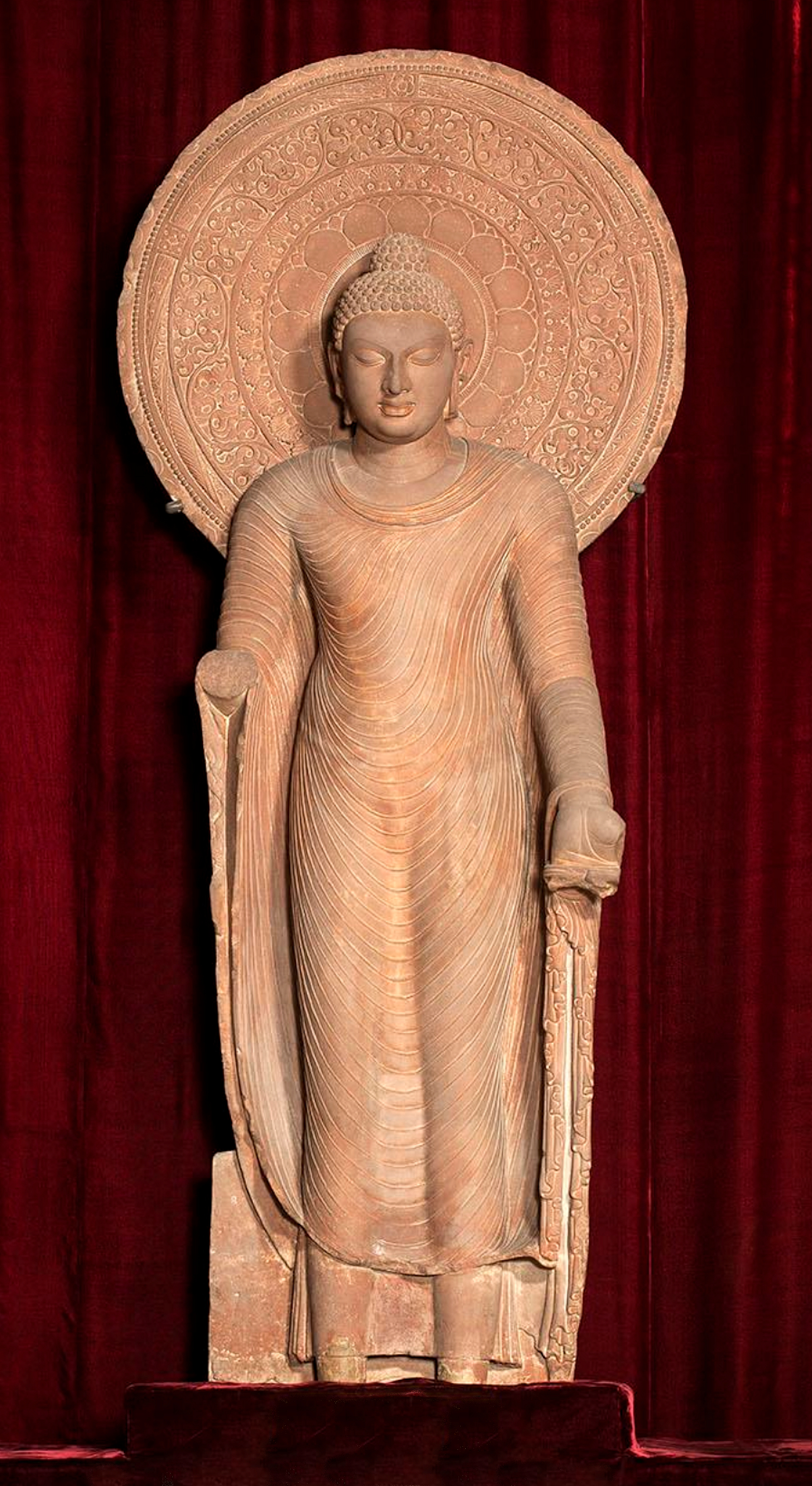
Standing Buddha from Mathura at Rashtrapati Bhavan, c. 5th century CE.

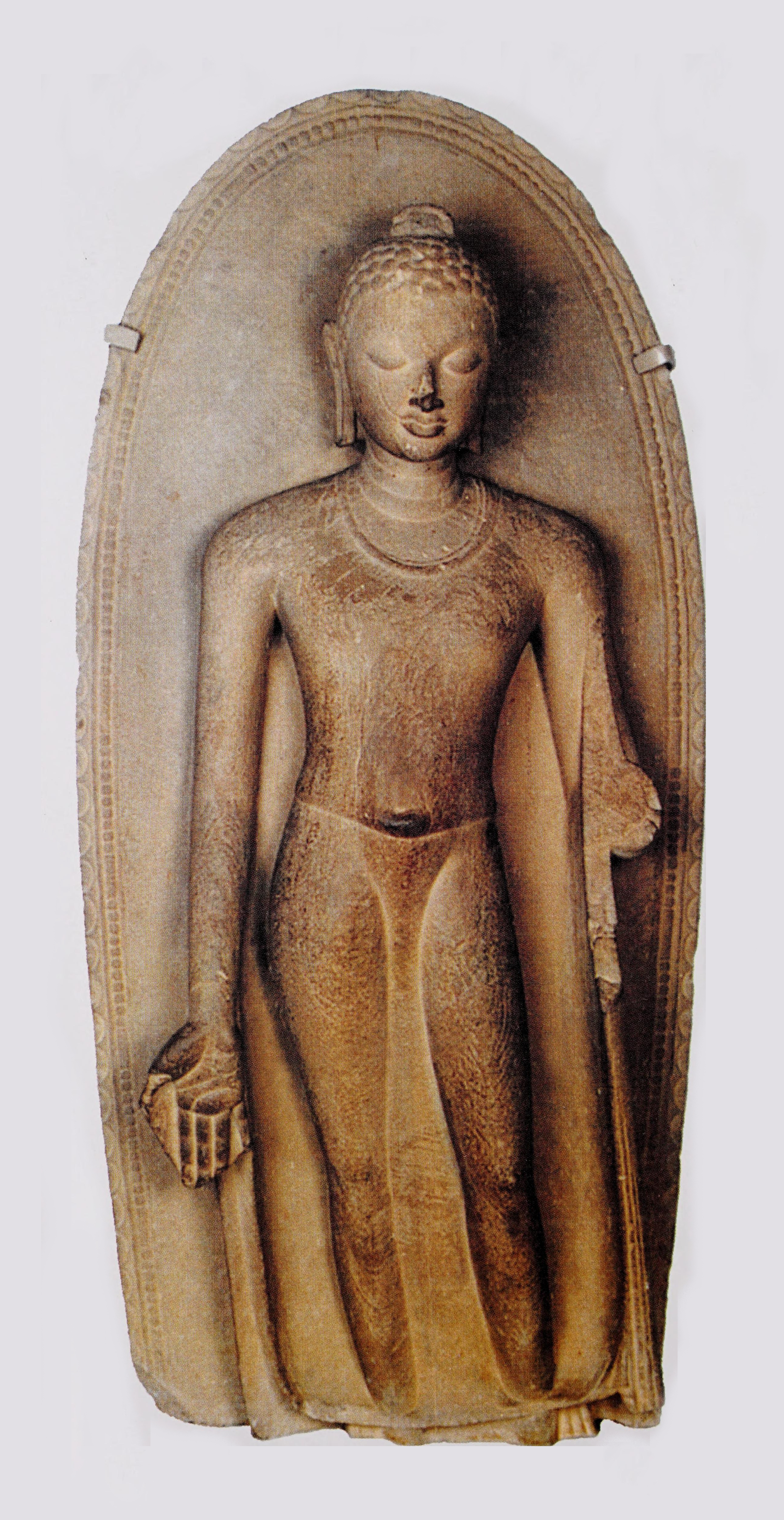
Sarnath standing Buddha, 5th century CE.

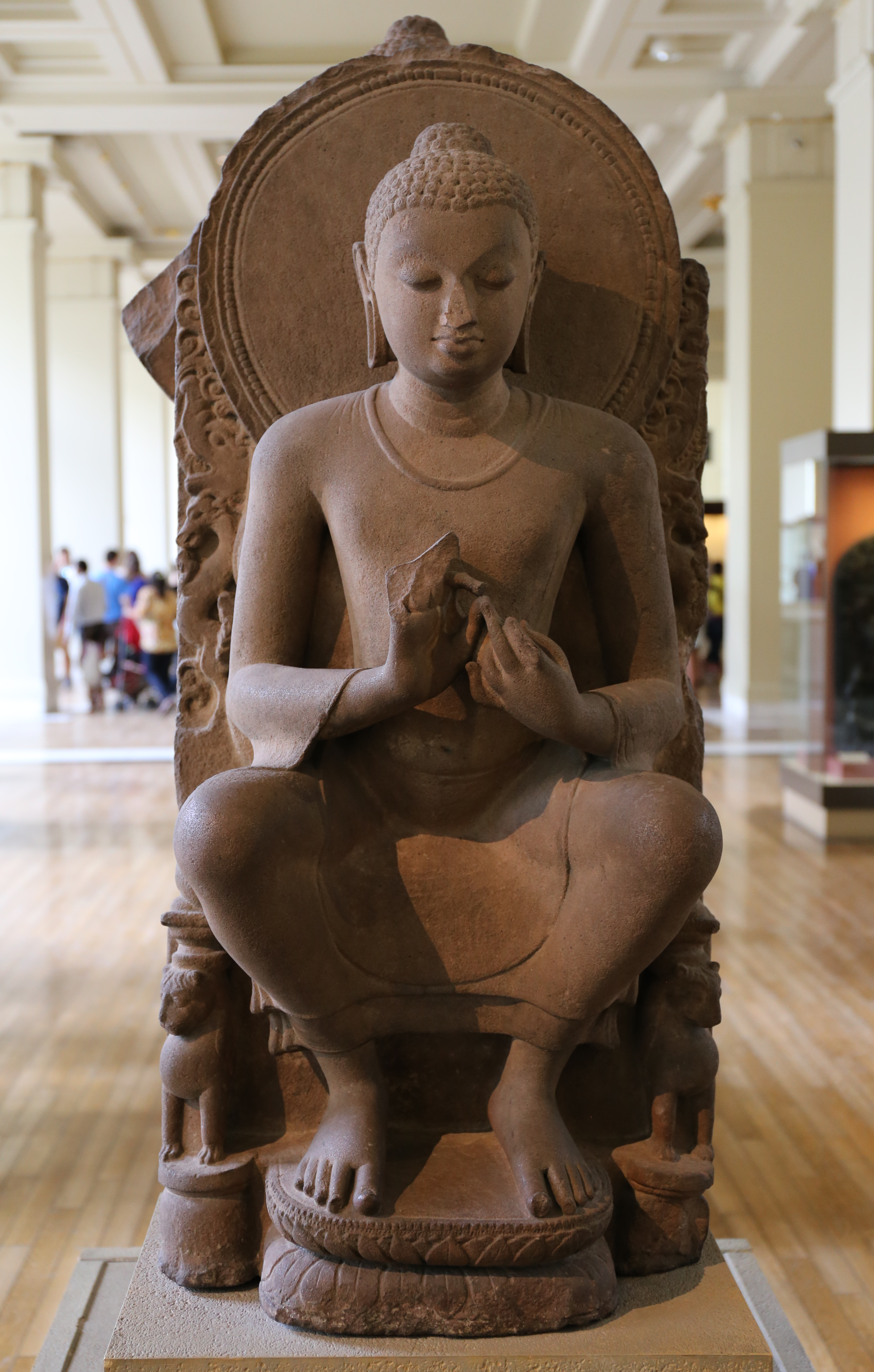
Seated Buddha, Gupta period.

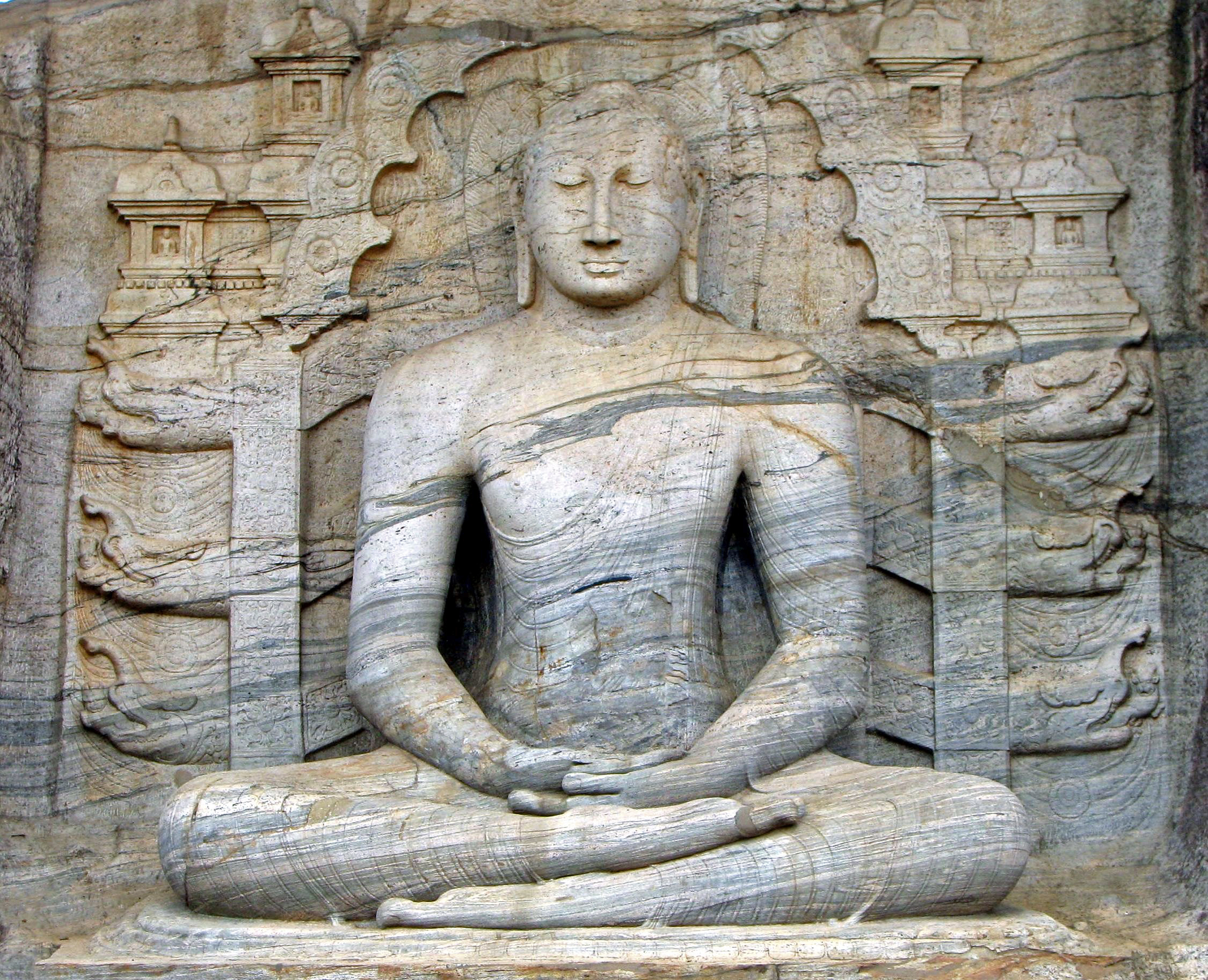
Seated Buddha at Gal Vihara, Sri Lanka.

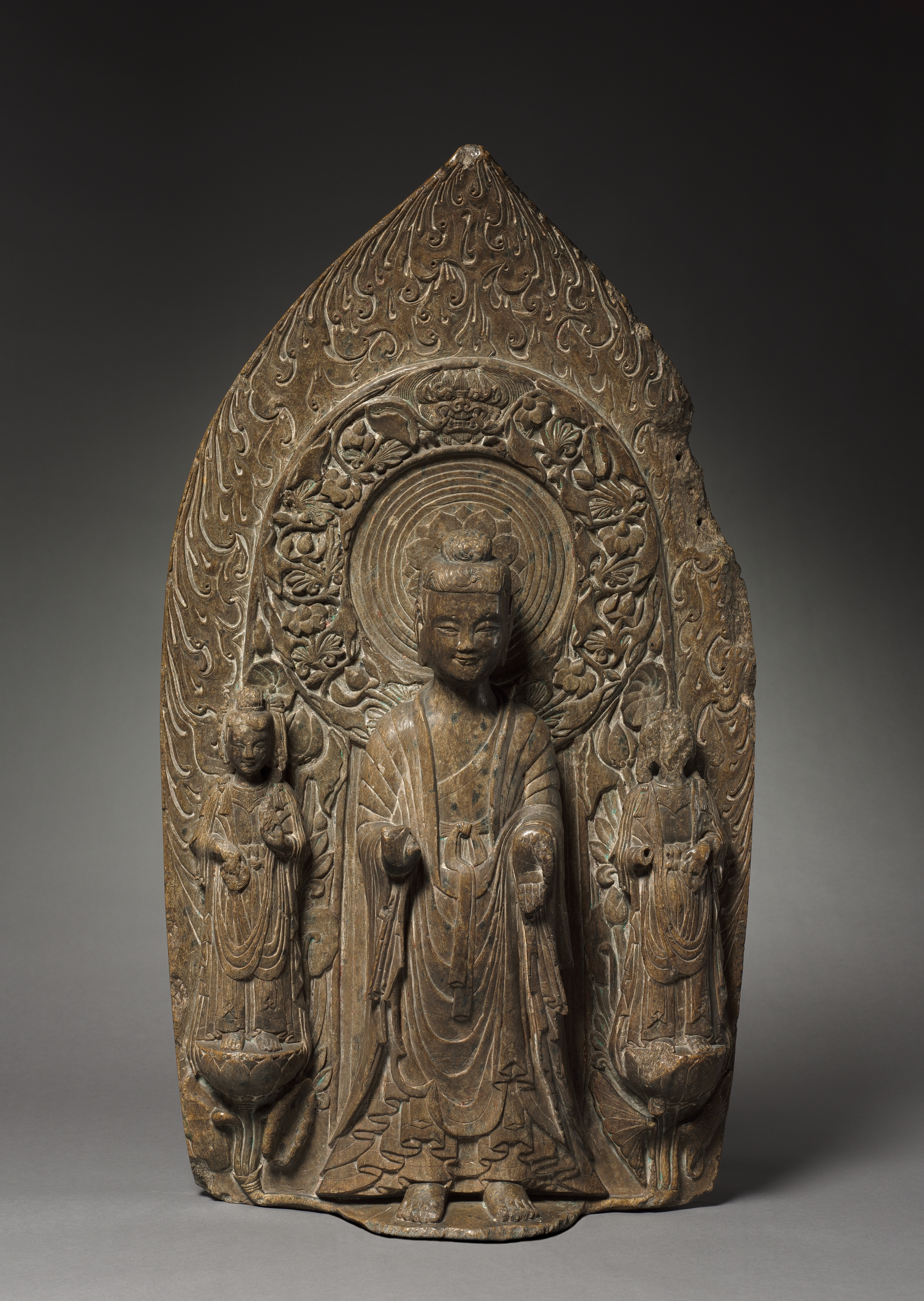
Chinese Stele with Sakyamuni and Bodhisattvas, Wei period, 536 CE.

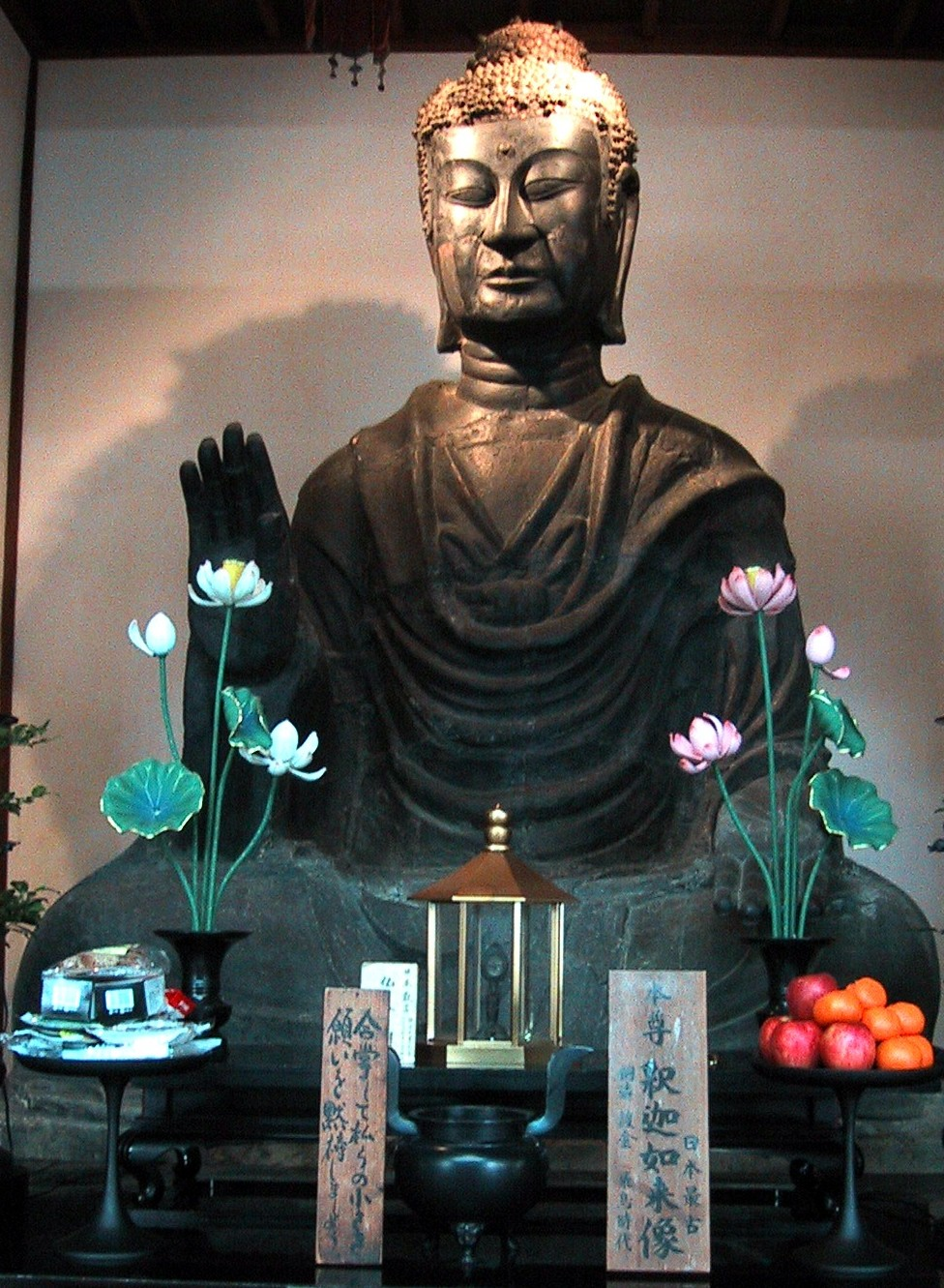
The Shakyamuni Daibutsu Bronze, c. 609, Nara, Japan.

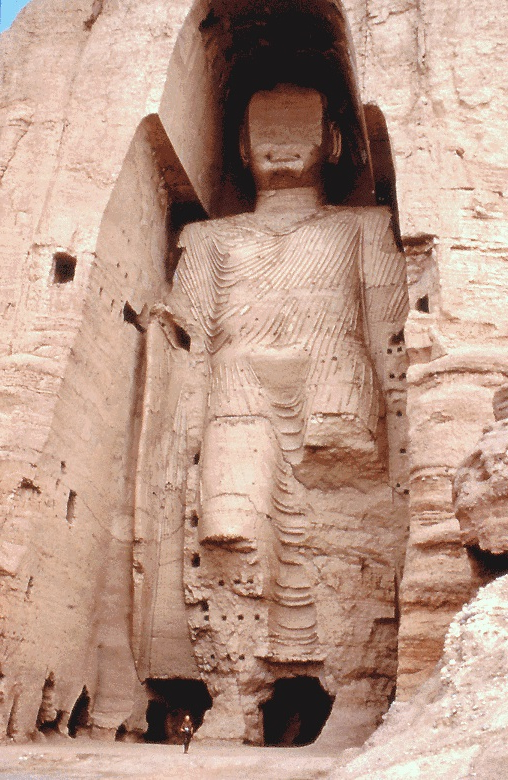
Buddhas of Bamiyan, Afghanistan.

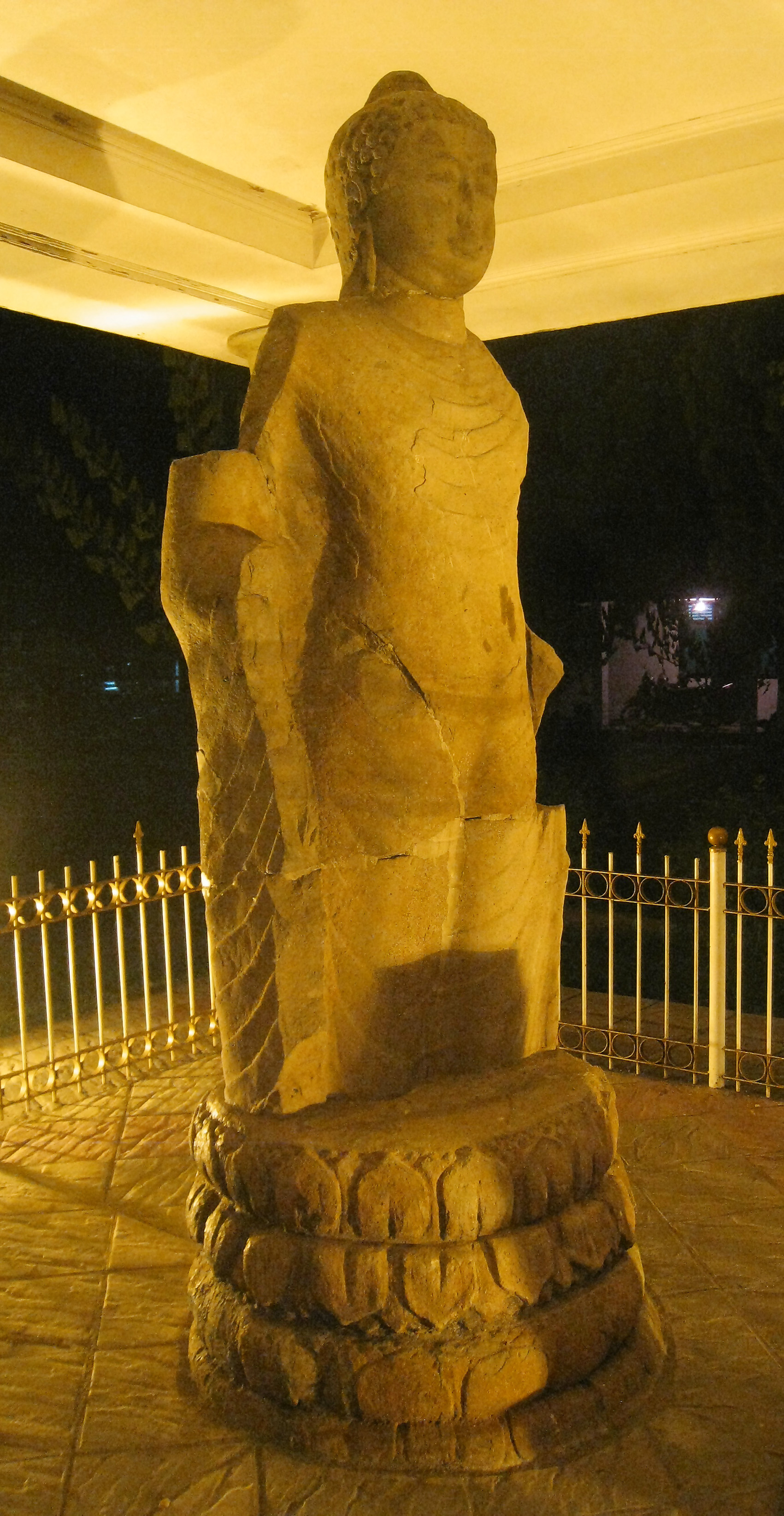
Amaravati style Buddha of Srivijaya period, Palembang, Indonesia, 7th century.

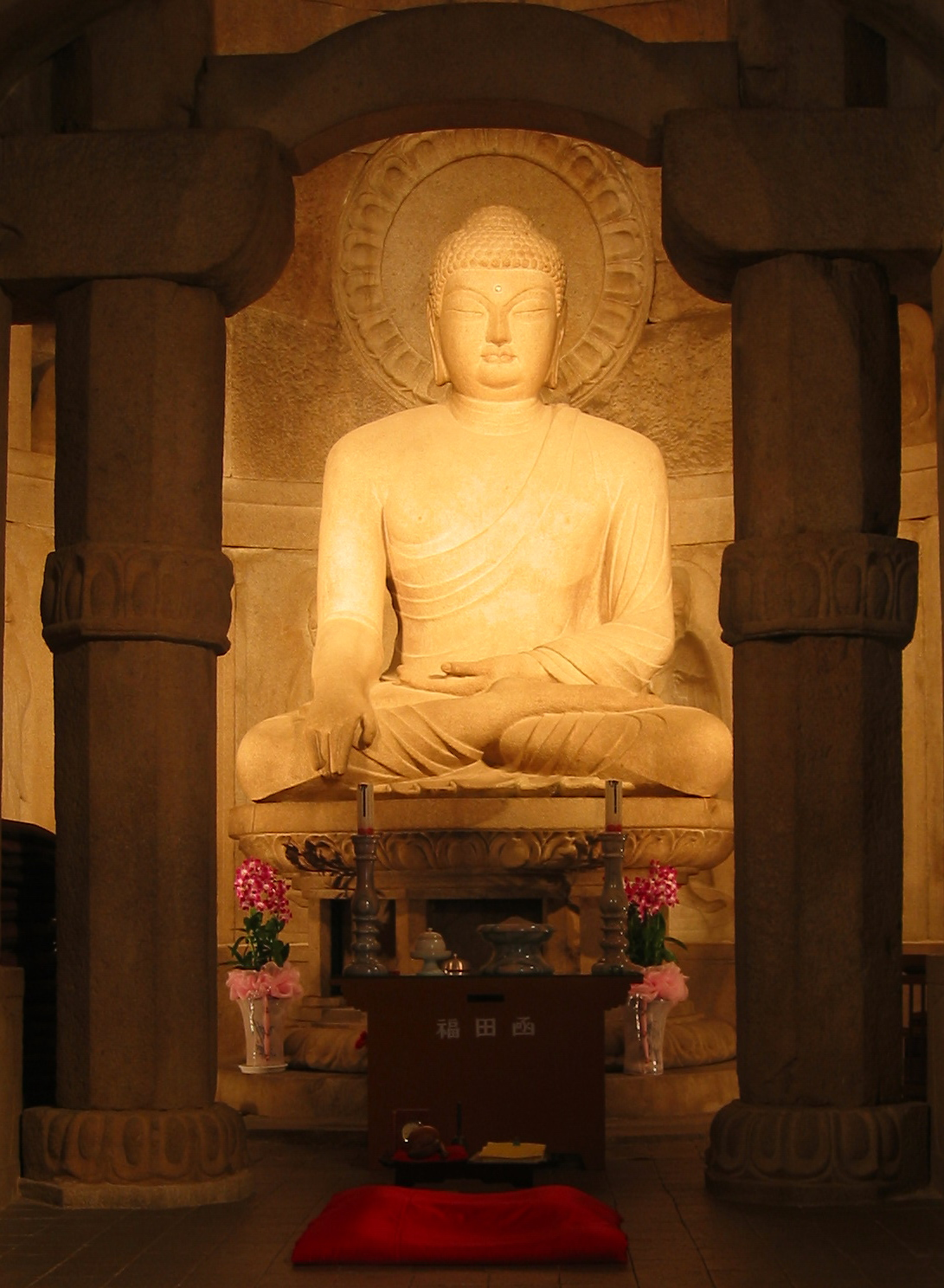
Korean Seokguram Cave Buddha, c. 774 CE.

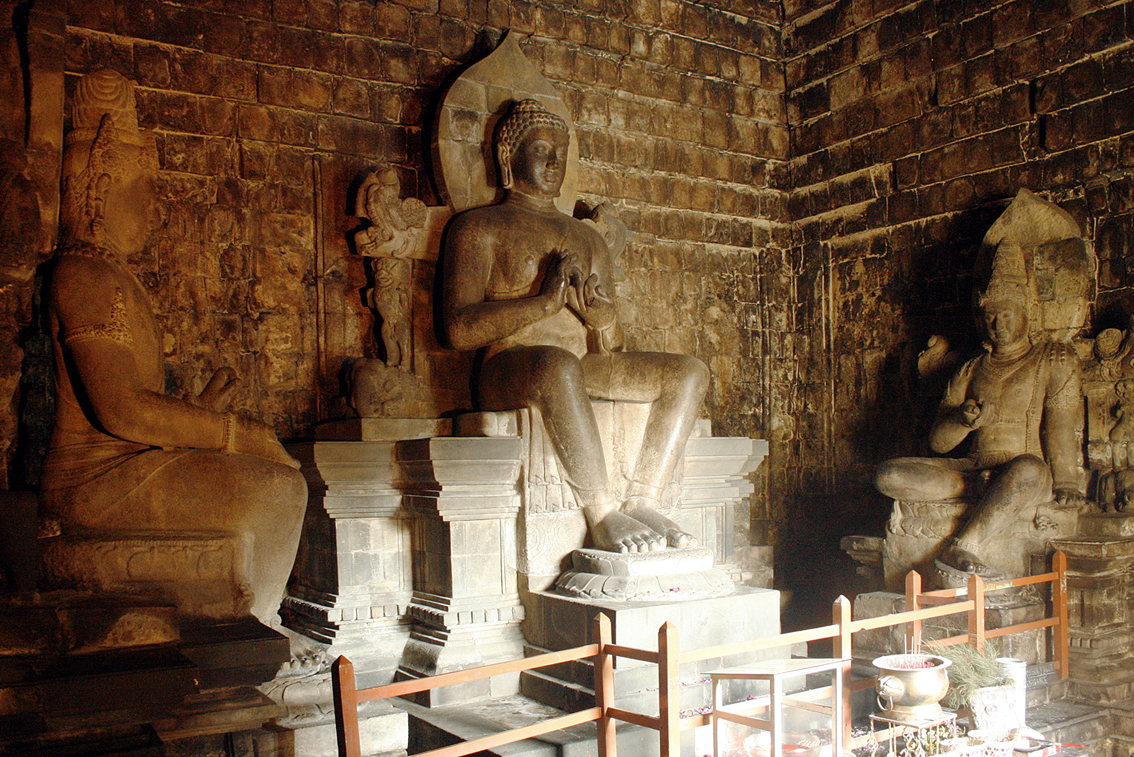
Seated Buddha Vairocana flanked by Avalokiteshvara and Vajrapani of Mendut temple, Central Java, Indonesia, early 9th century.

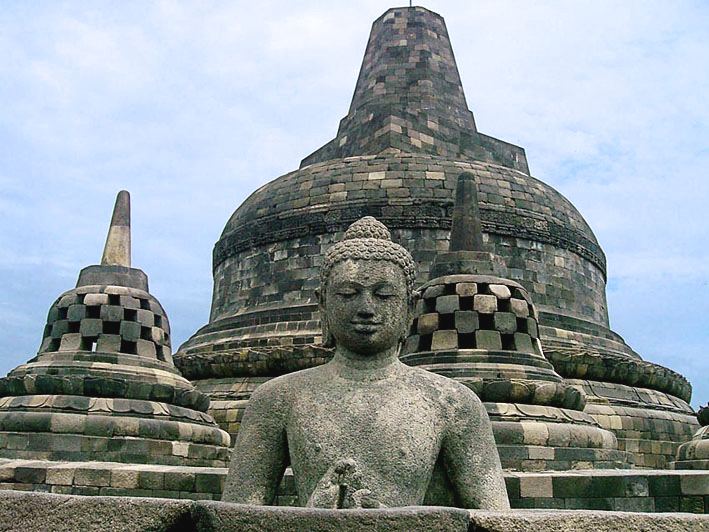
Buddha in the exposed stupa of Borobudur mandala, Central Java, Indonesia, c. 825.

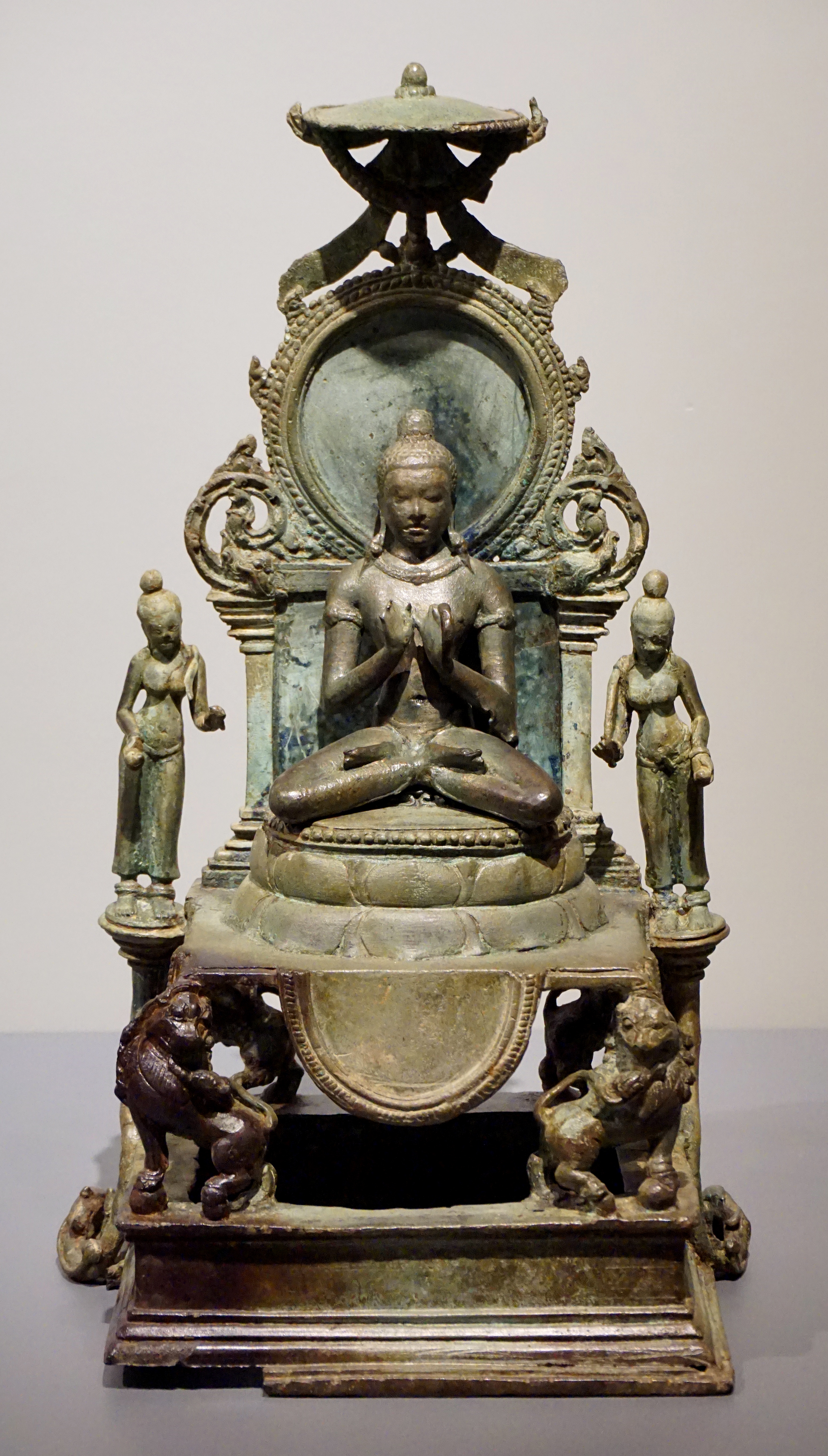
Vairocana Buddha of Srivijaya style, Southern Thailand, 9th century.

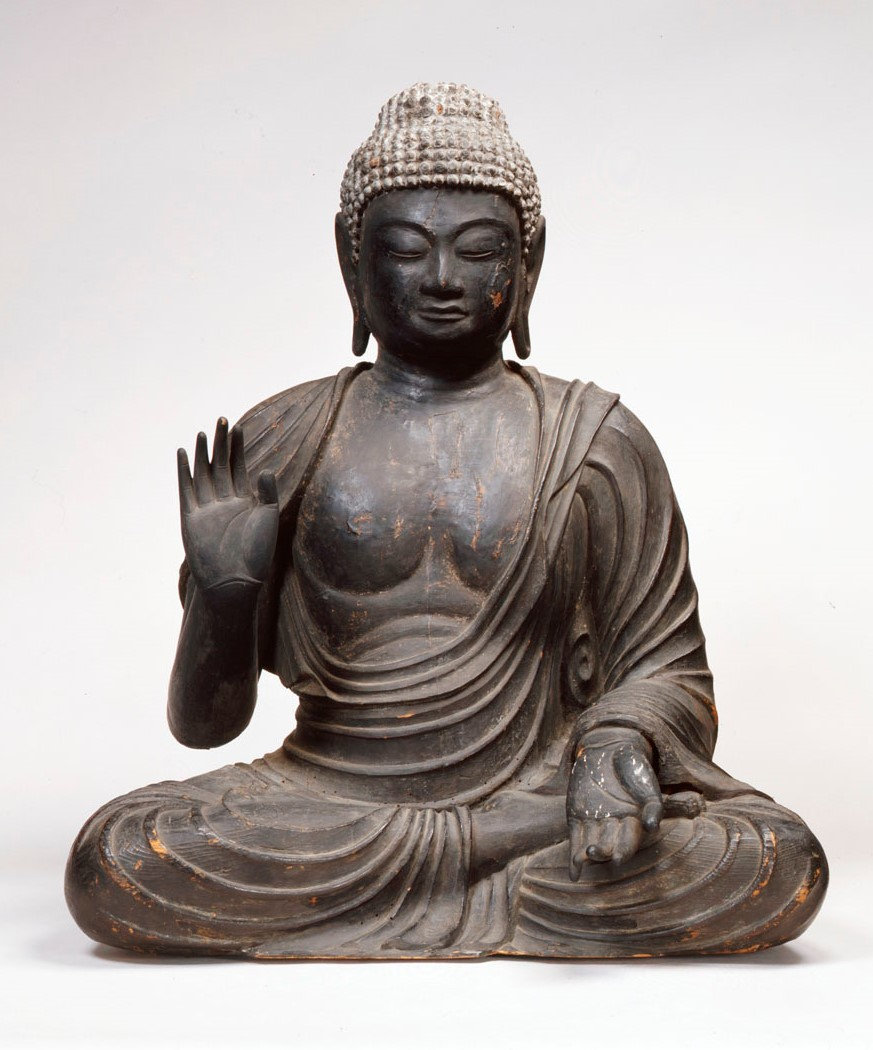
Seated Buddha, Japan, Heian period, 9th－10th century.

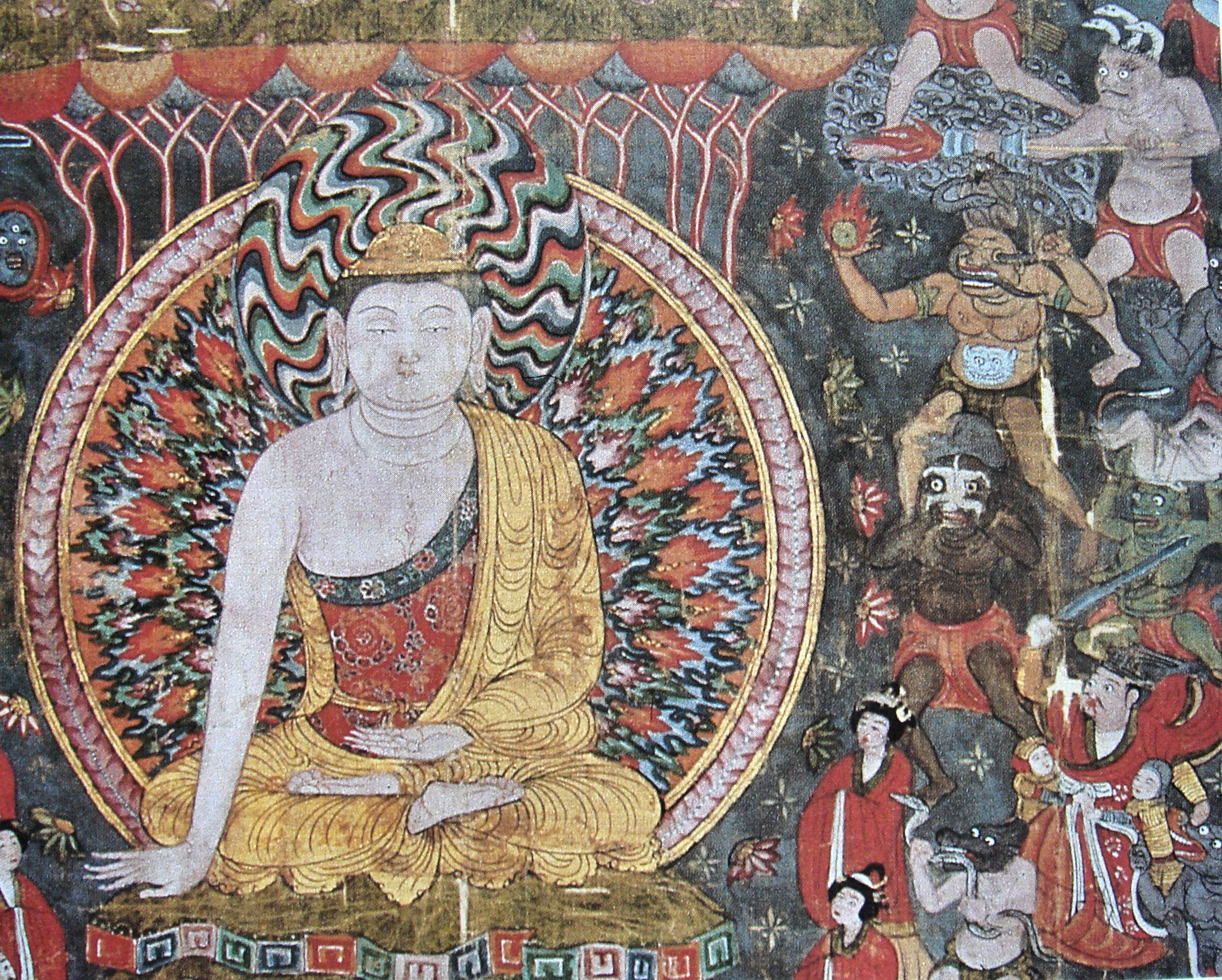
Attack of Mara, 10th century, Dunhuang.

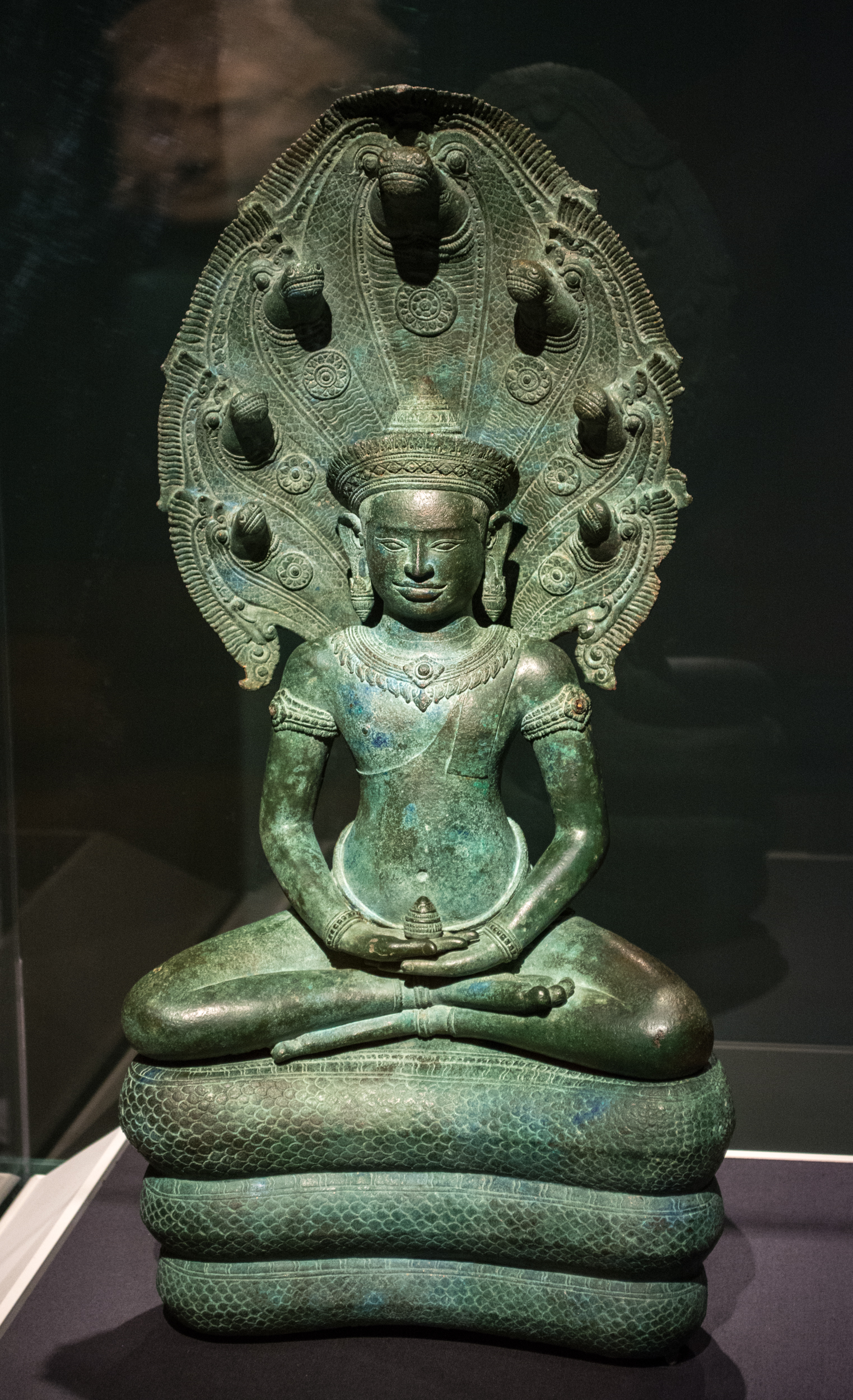
Cambodian Buddha with Mucalinda Nāga, c. 1100 CE, Banteay Chhmar, Cambodia

15th century Sukhothai Buddha.

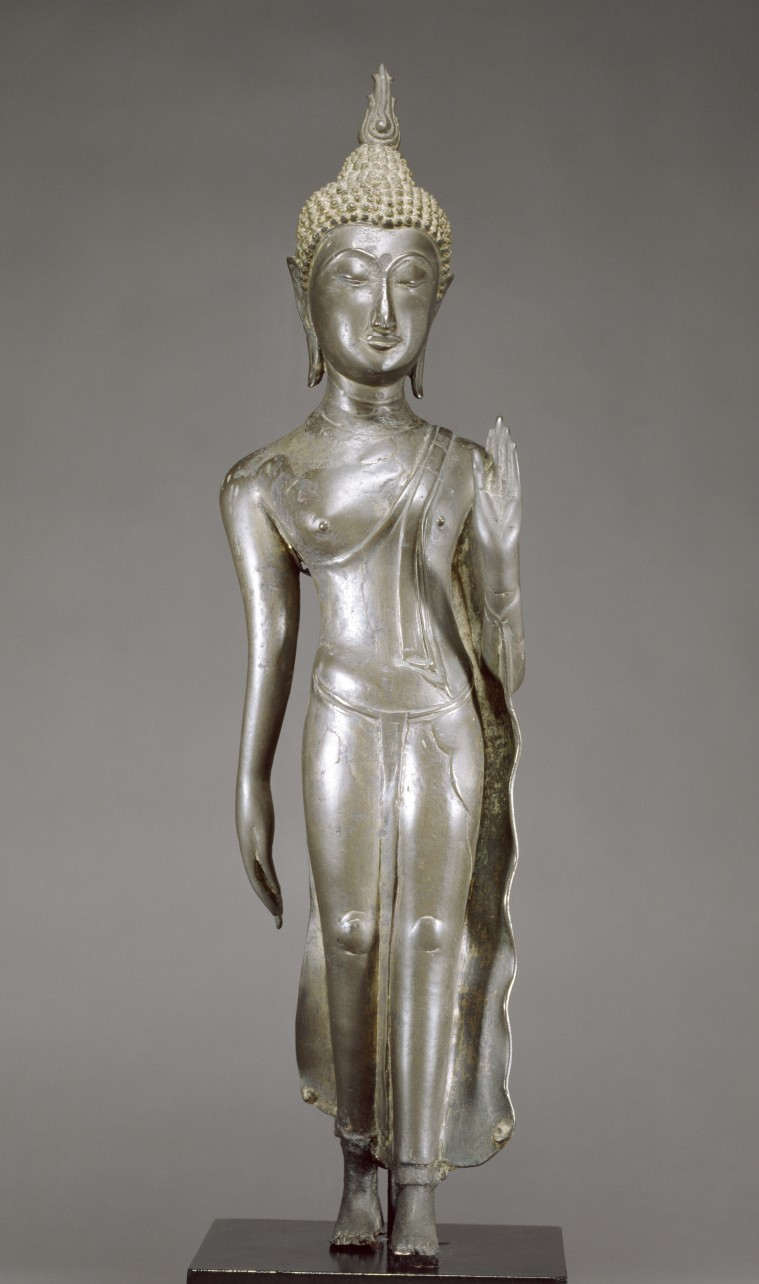
15th century Sukhothai Walking Buddha.

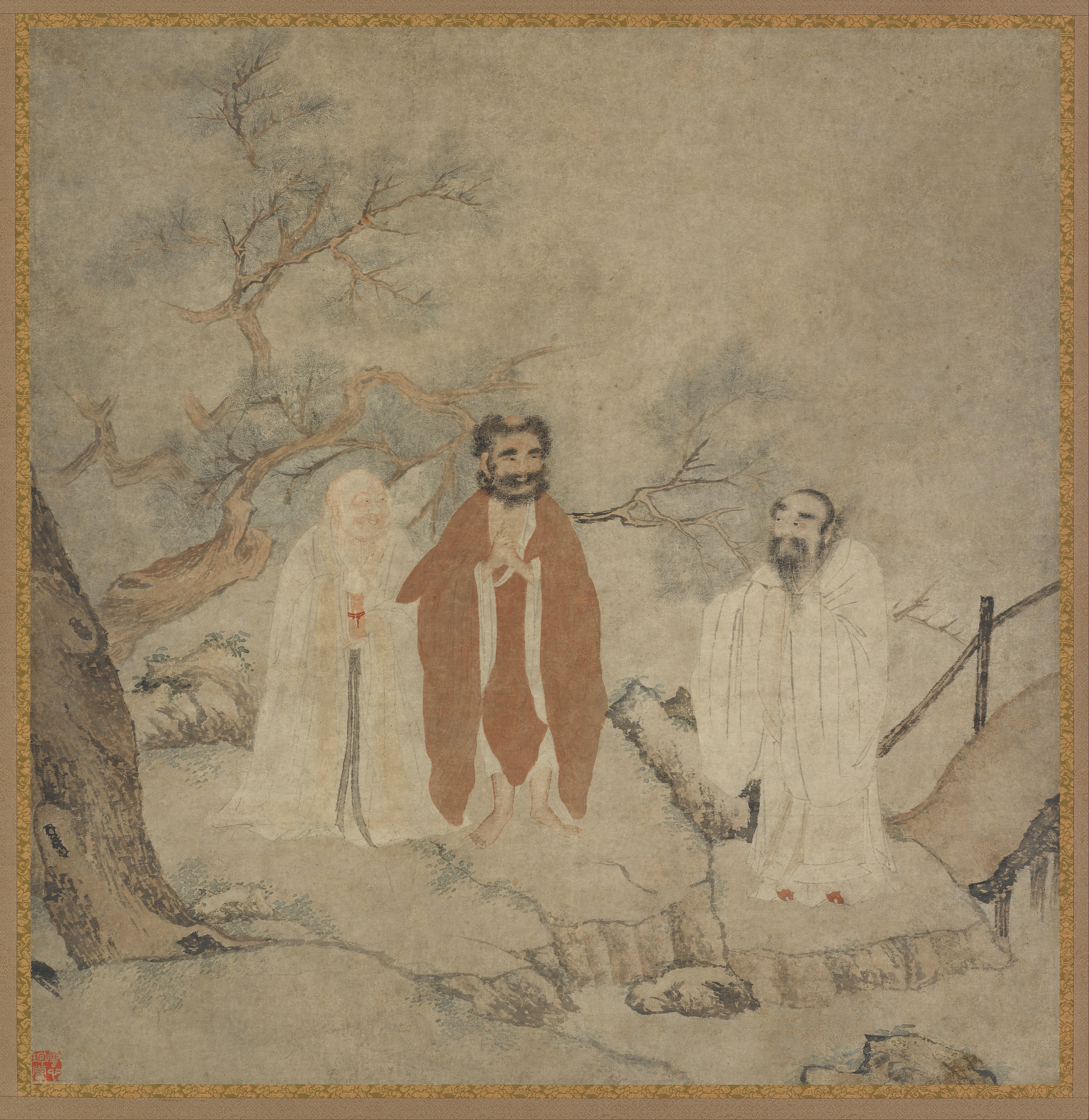
Sakyamuni, Lao Tzu, and Confucius, c. from 1368 until 1644.

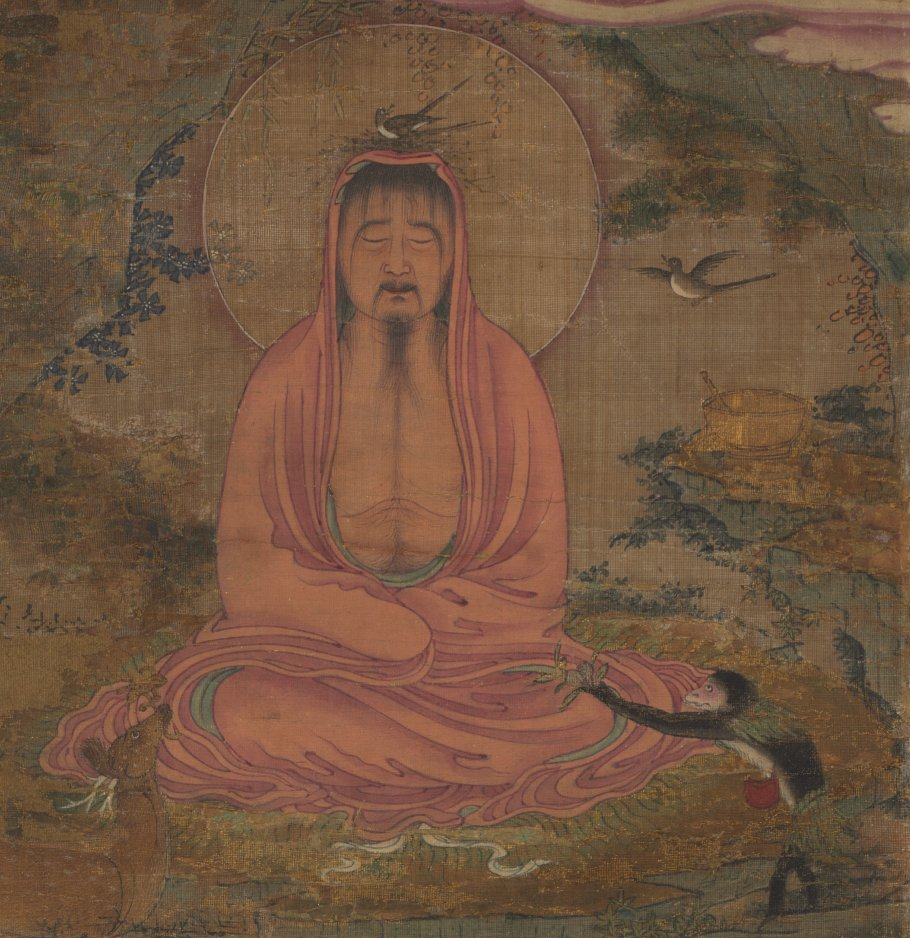
Chinese depiction of Shakyamuni, 1600.

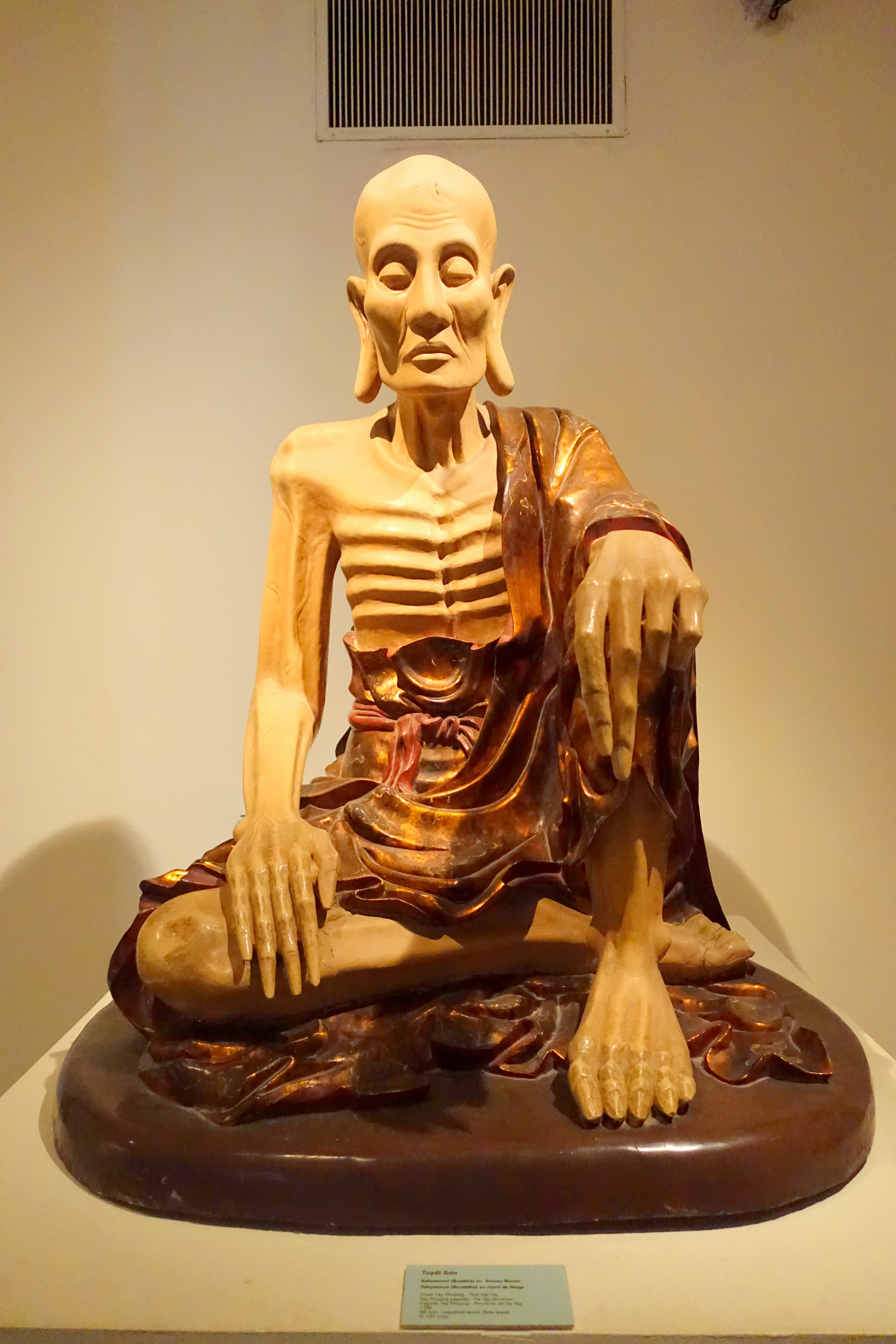
Buddha on the snowy mountain, Vietnam, 18th century

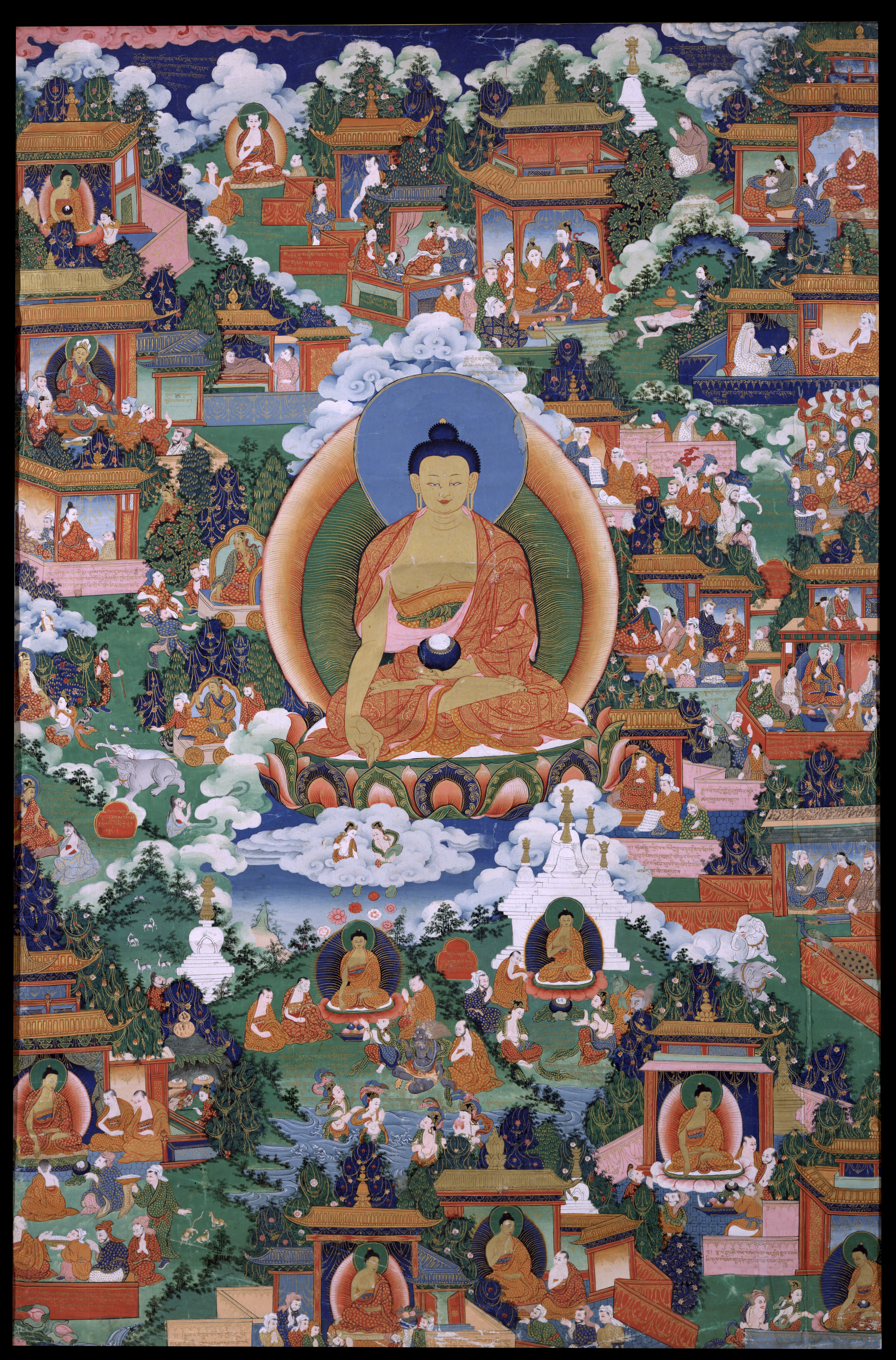
Shakyamuni Buddha with Avadana Legend Scenes, Tibetan, 19th century

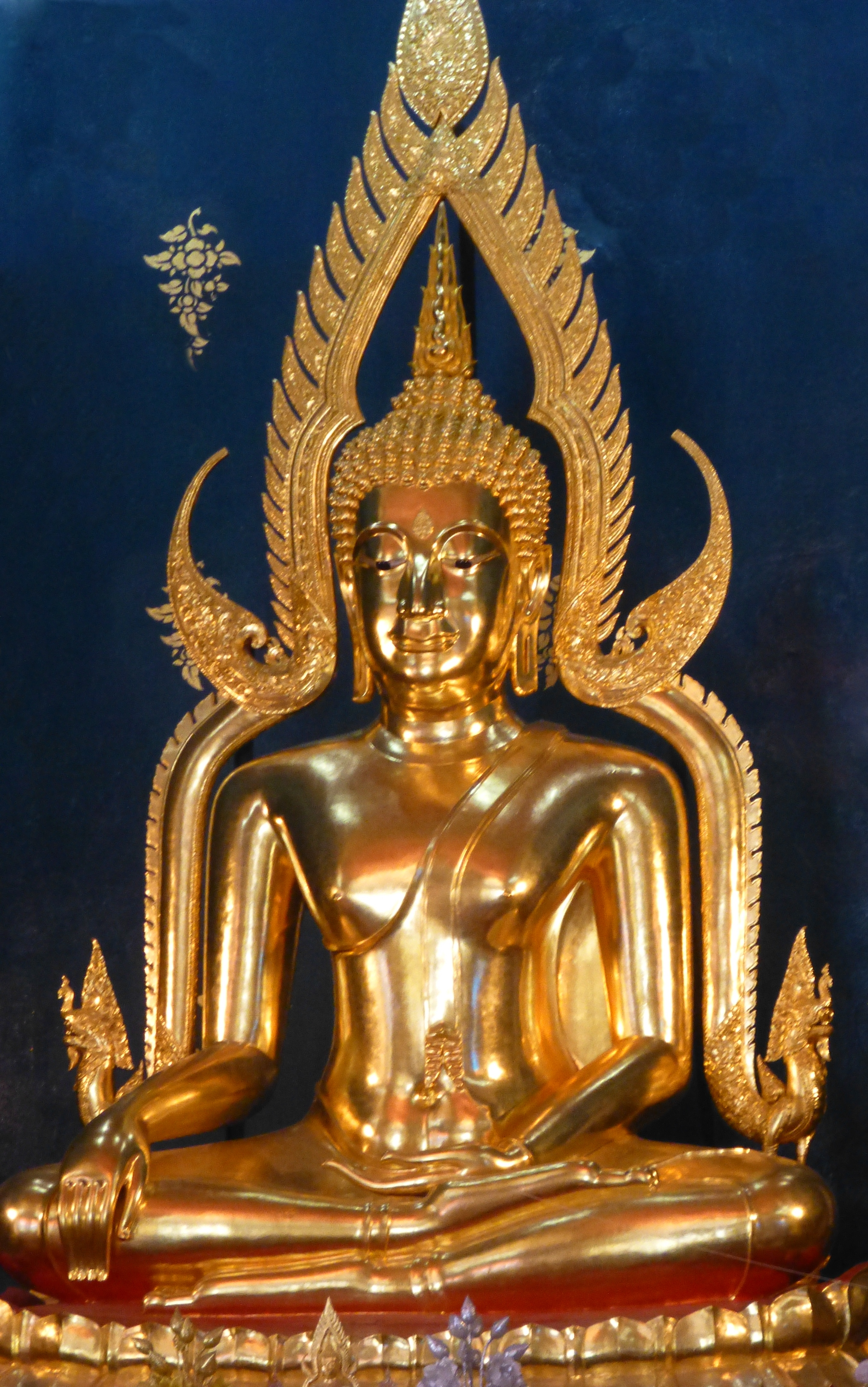
Golden Thai Buddha statue, Bodh Gaya.

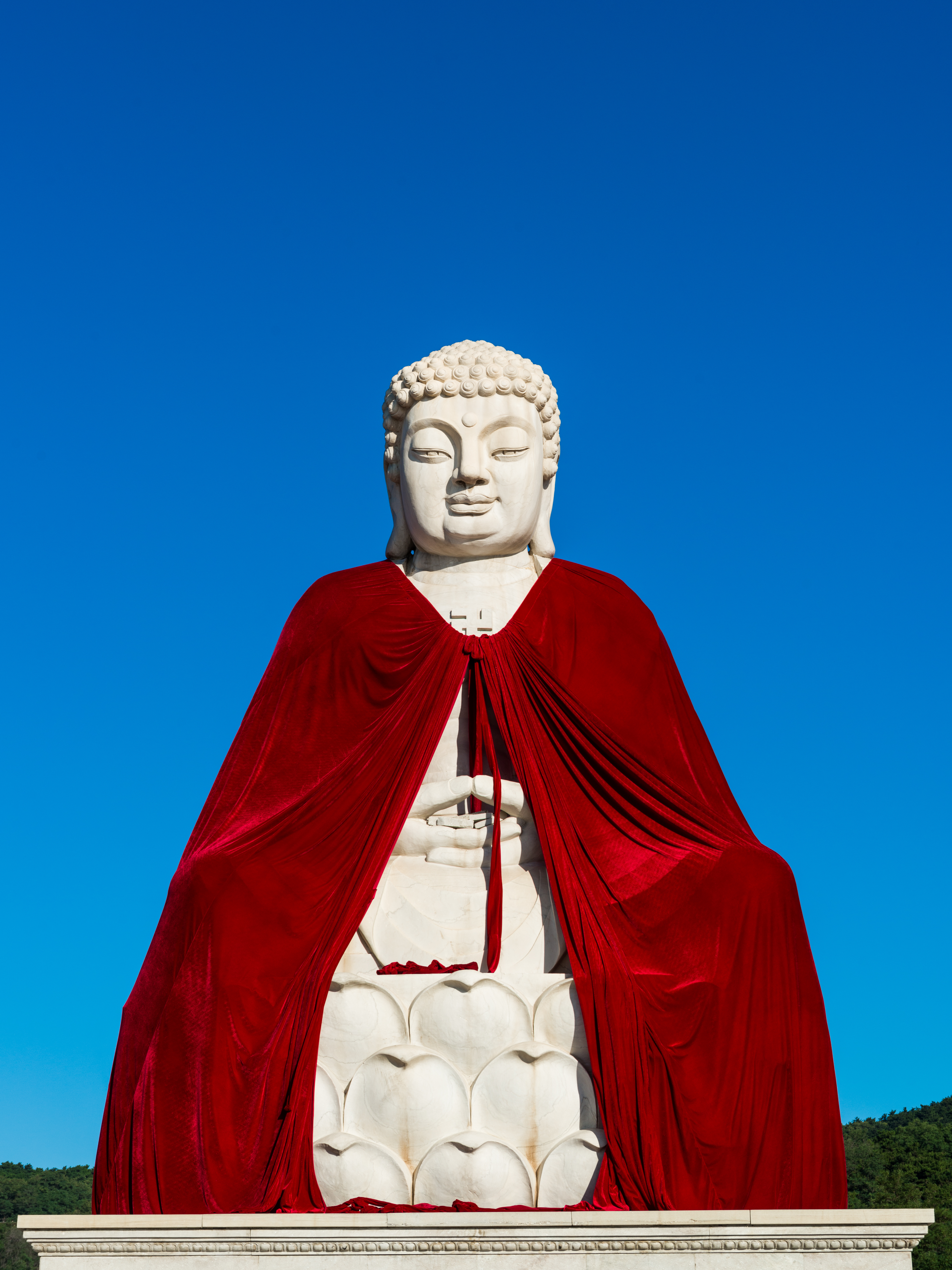
Gautama statue, Shanyuan Temple, Liaoning Province, China.

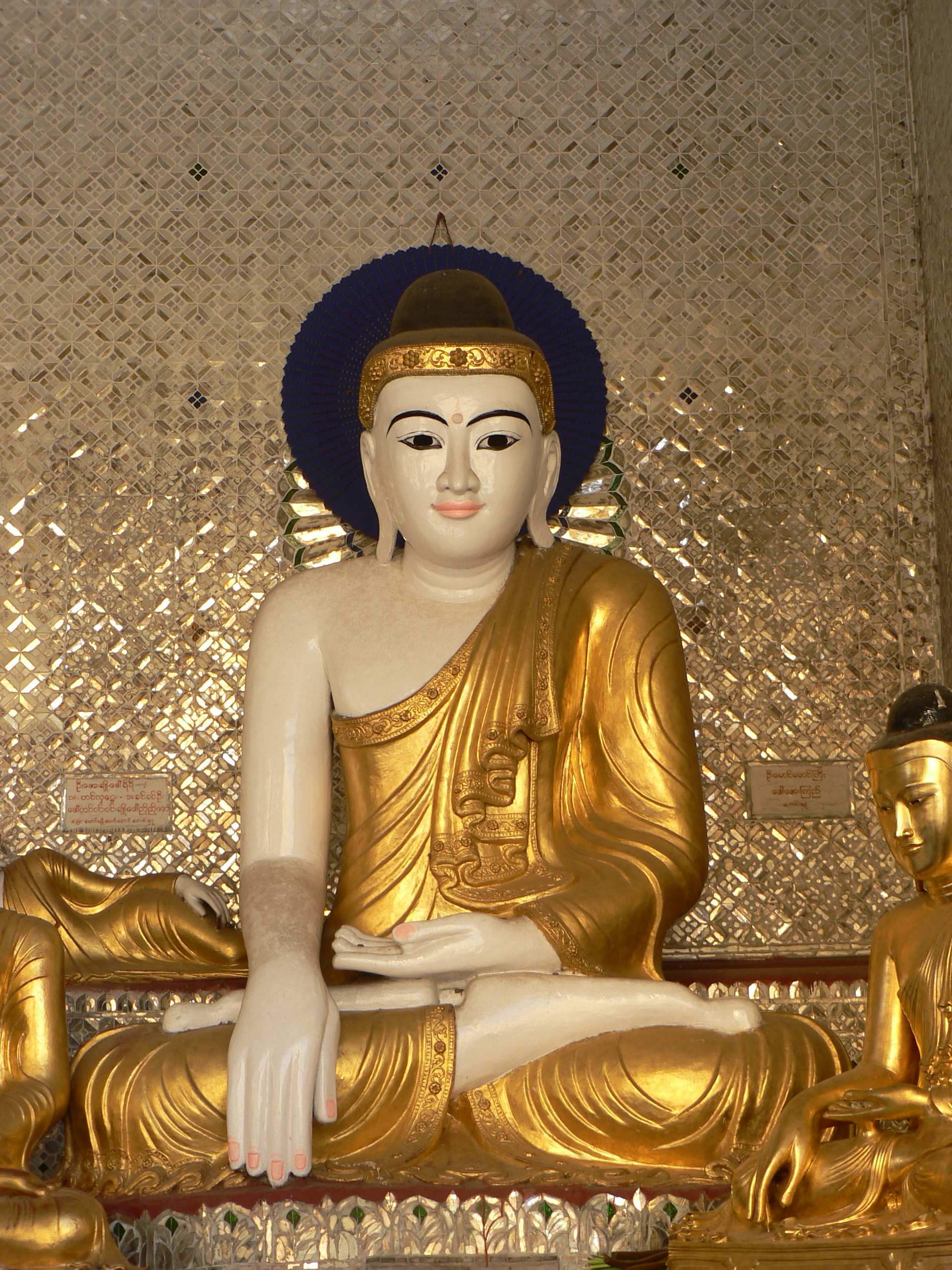
Burmese style Buddha, Shwedagon pagoda, Yangon.

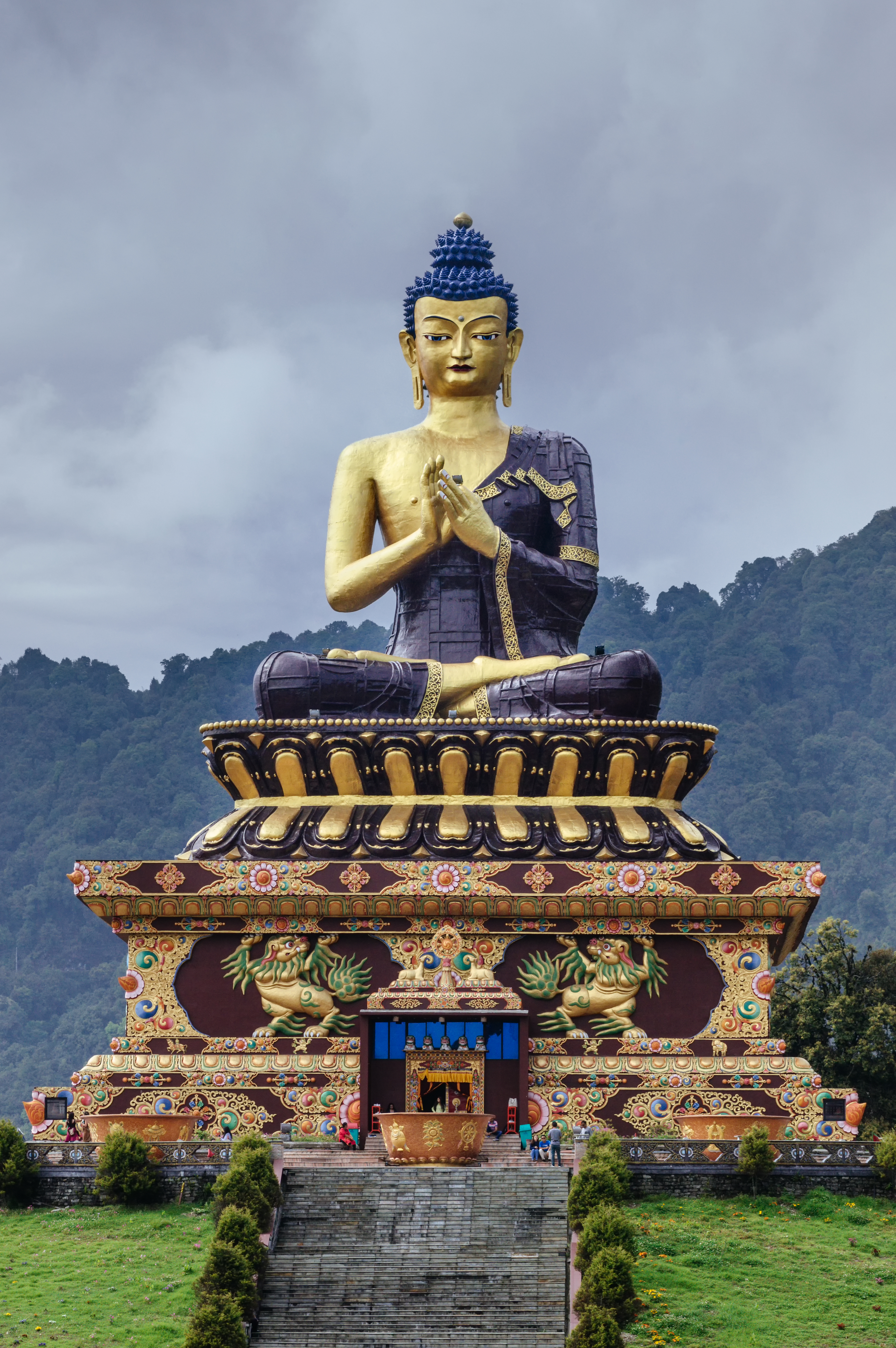
Large Gautama Buddha statue in Buddha Park of Ravangla.

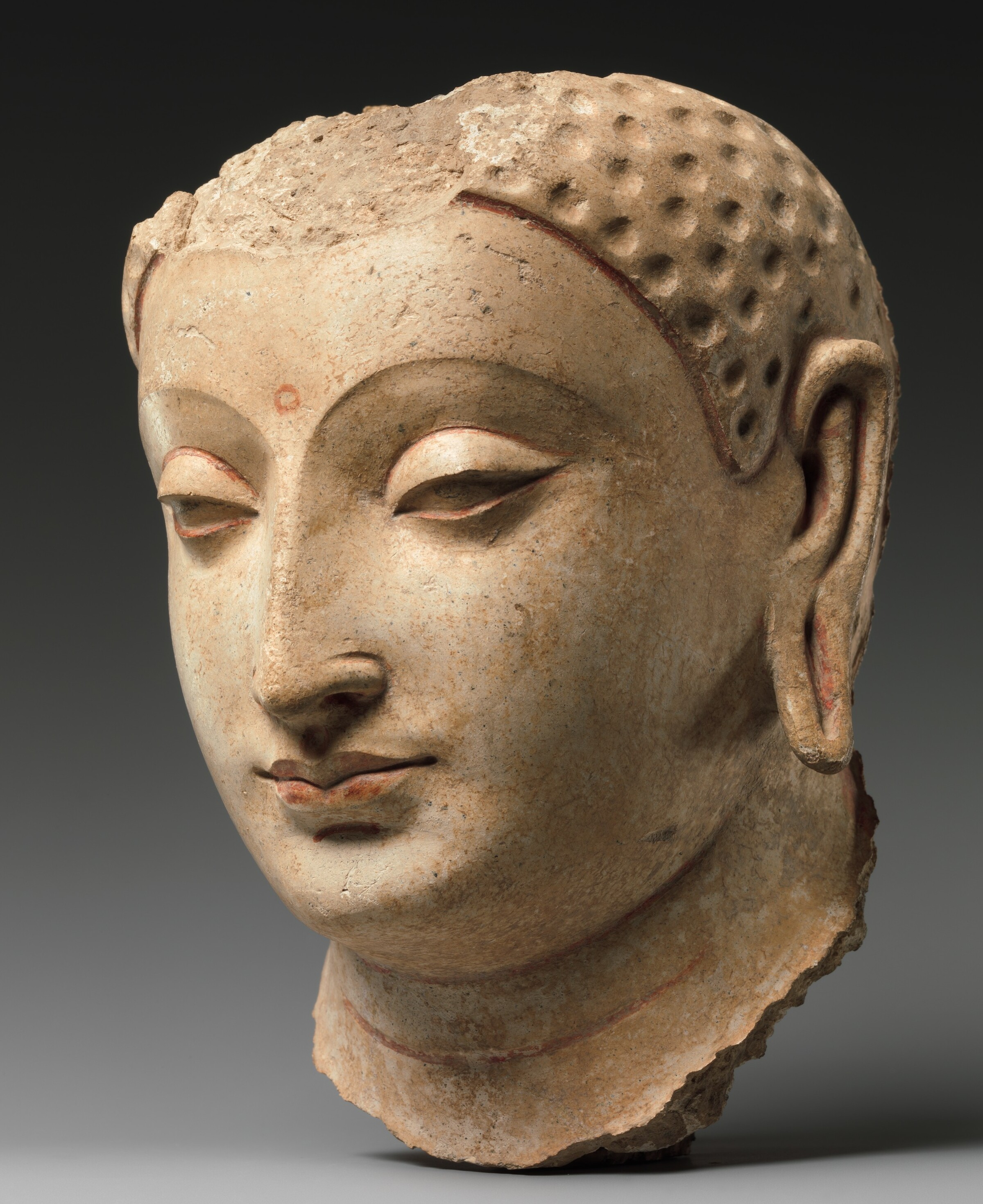
Head of Buddha, from Hadda, Afghanistan, c. 5th–6th century. Metropolitan Museum of Art.

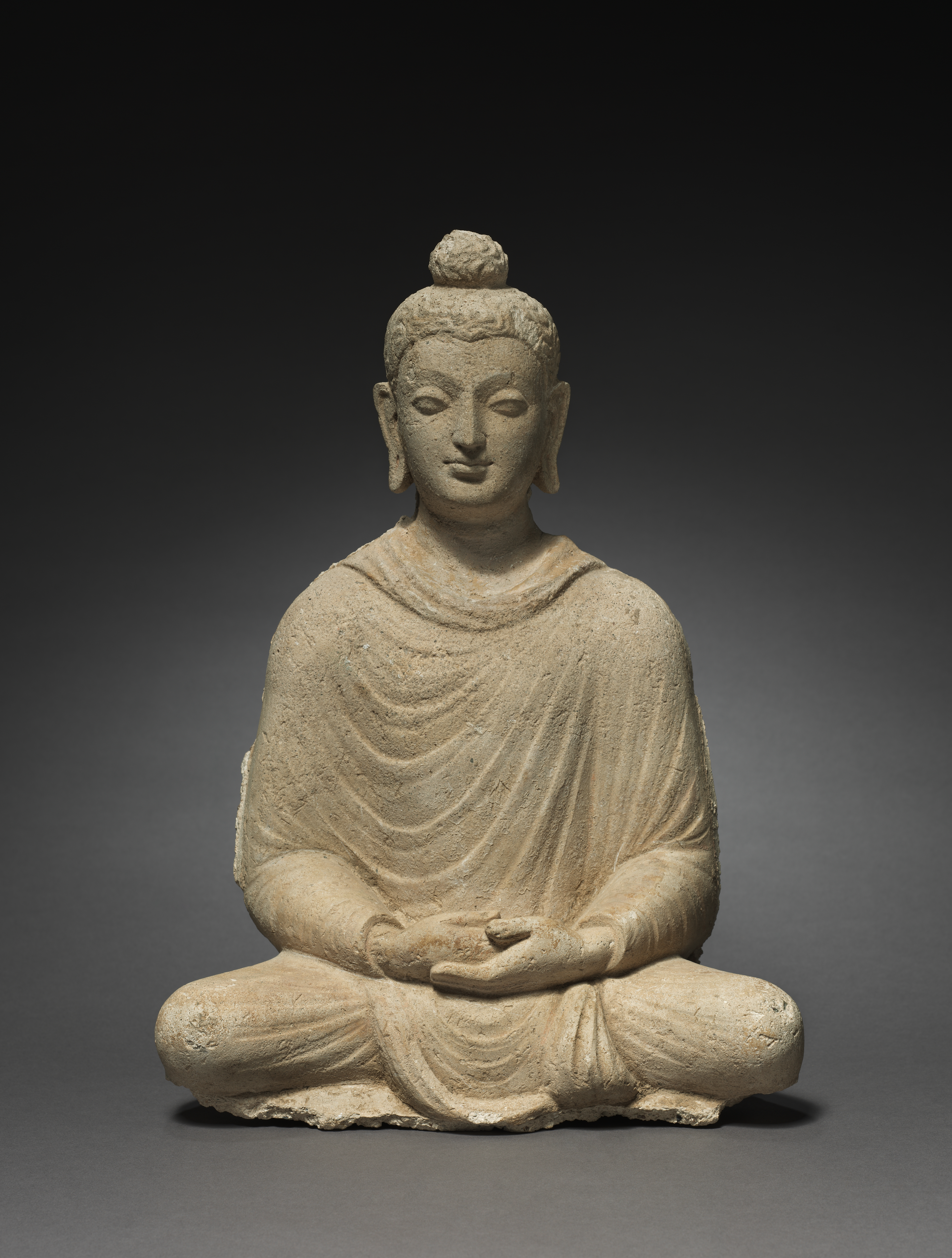
Seated Buddha, Hadda, Afghanistan, c. 300s CE

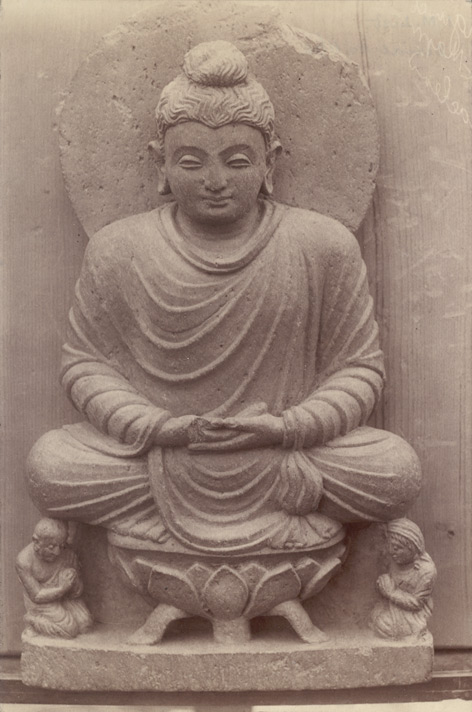
Buddha seated on a lotus throne in Swat Valley.

=== In other media ===
==== Films ====
- Buddha Dev (Life of Lord Buddha), a 1923 Indian silent film by Dhundiraj Govind Phalke, first depiction of the Buddha on film with Bhaurao Datar in the title role.
- Prem Sanyas (The Light of Asia), a 1925 silent film, directed by Franz Osten and Himansu Rai based on Arnold's epic poem with Rai also portraying the Buddha.
- Dedication of the Great Buddha (大仏開眼, Daibutsu Kaigen), a 1952 Japanese feature film representing the life of Buddha.
- Gotoma the Buddha, a 1957 Indian documentary film directed by Rajbans Khanna and produced by Bimal Roy.
- Siddhartha, a 1972 drama film by Conrad Rooks, an adaptation Hesse's novel. It stars Shashi Kapoor as Siddhartha, a contemporary of the Buddha.
- Little Buddha, a 1994 film by Bernardo Bertolucci, the film stars Keanu Reeves as Prince Siddhartha.
- The Legend of Buddha, a 2004 Indian animated film by Shamboo Falke.
- Buddha's life, 2011 This animation movie is about the life of Buddha based on Pali Canon (Theravada Buddhism) and other commentaries. It was produced by members of the Buddhist community in cooperation with the Department of Religious Affairs and the National Office of Buddhism, Thailand. It is considered one of the most accurate story of the Buddha. It is almost 5 hours long and very detailed. The production took 8 years to complete (from 2003-2011).
- The Life of Buddha, or Prawat Phra Phuttajao, a 2007 Thai animated feature film about the life of Gautama Buddha, based on the Tipitaka.
- Tathagatha Buddha, a 2008 Indian film by Allani Sridhar. Based on Sadguru Sivananda Murthy's book Gautama Buddha, it stars Sunil Sharma as the Buddha.
- Sri Siddhartha Gautama, a 2013 Sinhalese epic biographical film based on the life of Lord Buddha.
- A Journey of Samyak Buddha, a 2013 Indian film by Praveen Damle, based on B. R. Ambedkar's 1957 Navayana book The Buddha and His Dhamma with Abhishek Urade in the title role.

==== Television ====
- Buddha, a 1996 Indian series which aired on Sony TV. It stars Arun Govil as the Buddha.
- The Buddha 2010 PBS documentary by filmmaker David Grubin and narrated by Richard Gere.
- Buddha, a 2013 Indian drama series on Zee TV starring Himanshu Soni in the title role.

==== Literature ====
- The Light of Asia, an 1879 epic poem by Edwin Arnold
- The Buddha and His Dhamma, a treatise on Buddha's life and philosophy, by B. R. Ambedkar
- Before He Was Buddha: The Life of Siddhartha, by Hammalawa Saddhatissa
- Buddha, a manga series that ran from 1972 to 1983 by Osamu Tezuka
- Siddhartha novel by Hermann Hesse, written in German in 1922
- Lord of Light, a novel by Roger Zelazny depicts a man in a far future Earth Colony who takes on the name and teachings of the Buddha
- Creation, a 1981 novel by Gore Vidal, includes the Buddha as one of the religious figures that the main character encounters

==== Music ====
- The Light of Asia, an 1886 oratorio by Dudley Buck based on Arnold's poem
- Karuna Nadee, a 2010 oratorio by Dinesh Subasinghe

== See also ==
- Buddhist pilgrimage sites
- Family of Gautama Buddha
- List of Indian philosophers
- List of places where Gautama Buddha stayed

== Notes ==
Religious titles
Preceded by Kassapa Buddha	🪷 Buddhist Patriarch 🪷	Succeeded by Maitreya Buddha
