= Four sights =

Event in the life of the Buddha

Translations of Four sights
- English: Four sights
- Burmese: နိမိတ်ကြီးလေးပါး
- Chinese: 四門遊觀/四门遊观 (Pinyin: Sìményóuguān)
- Indonesian: Empat Penglihatan
- Japanese: 四門出遊 (Rōmaji: Shimonshutsuyū)
- Thai: เทวทูต

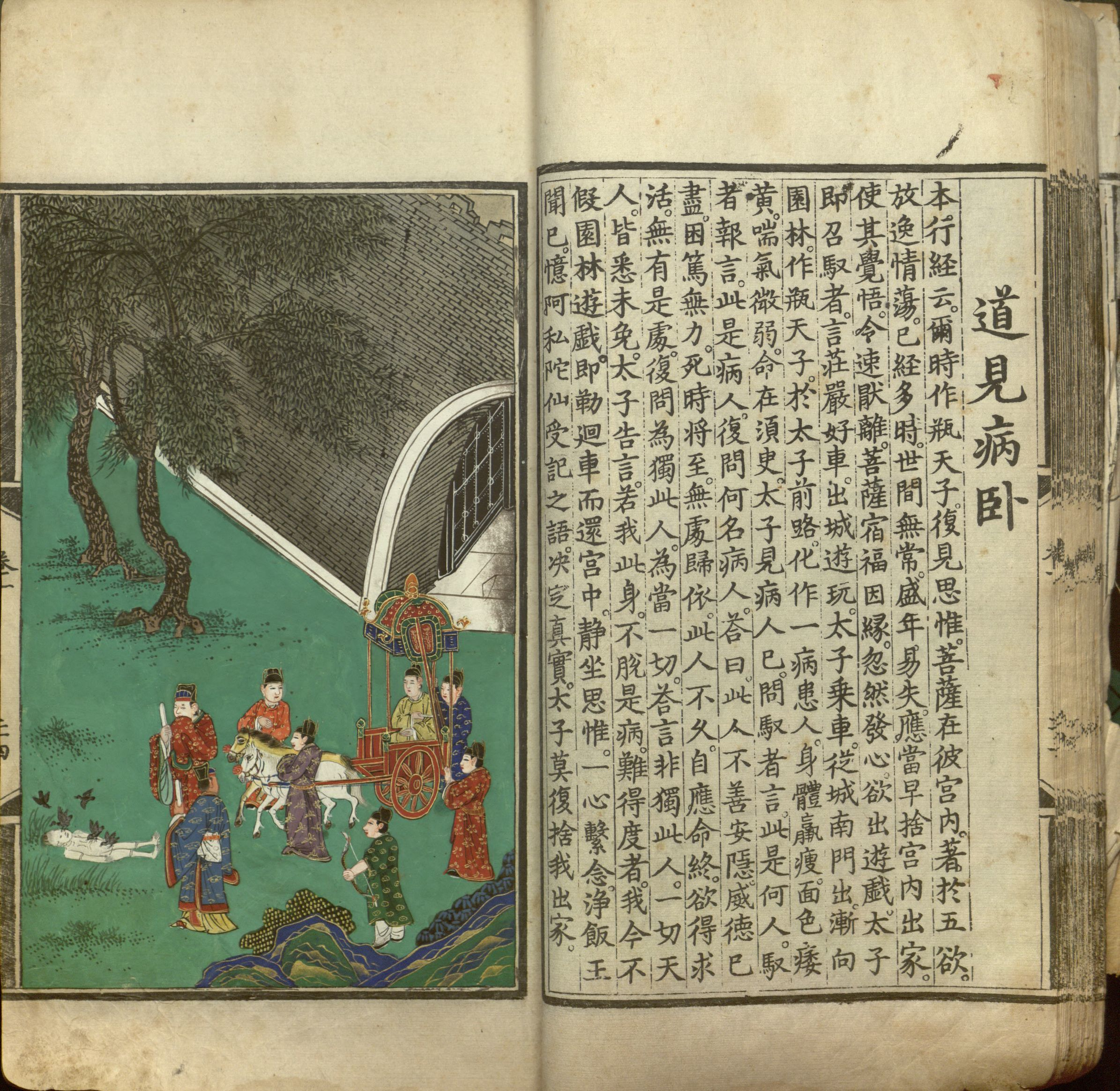
Siddhartha sees the dead man, China, 15th-century printed and hand-coloured edition of Baocheng's biography.

The four sights are four events described in the legendary account of Gautama Buddha's life which led to his realization of the impermanence and the ultimate dissatisfaction of conditioned existence. According to this legend, before these encounters Gautama Siddhartha had been confined to his palace by his father, who feared that he would become an ascetic if he came into contact with sufferings of life according to a prediction. However, his first venture out of the palace affected him deeply and made him realize the sufferings of all, and compelled him to begin his spiritual journey as a wandering ascetic, which eventually led to his enlightenment. The spiritual feeling of urgency experienced by Siddhārtha Gautama is referred to as saṃvega.

== The Legendary Account of the Four Sights ==
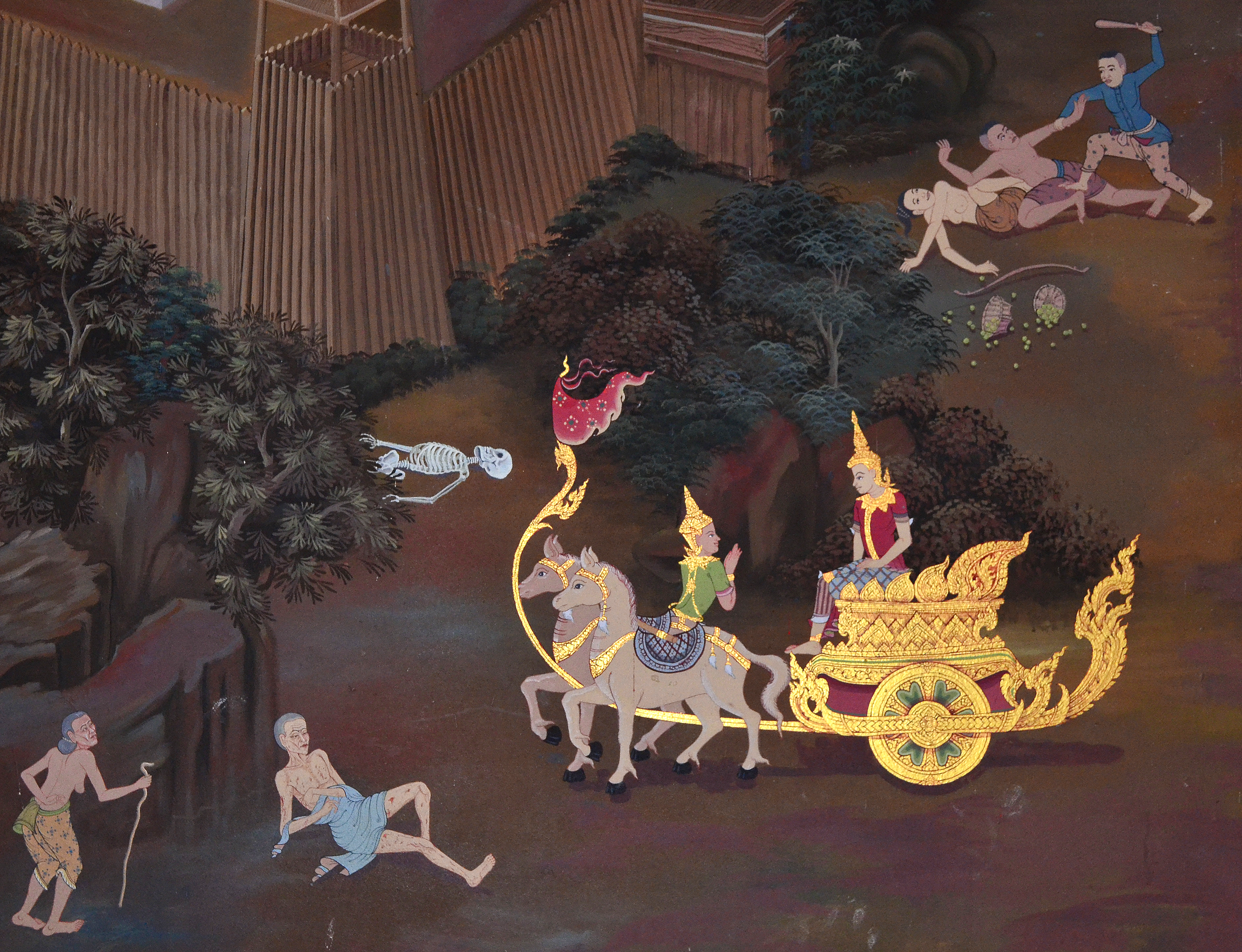
Modern Thai temple mural (detail)

=== Background ===
Siddhartha, belonged to the Kshatriya gana(clan) of the Sakya. He was born in Lumbini near Kapilavastu in Nepal. His father was the king of the Sakya clan. After the birth of his son, King Śuddhodana called upon eight Brahmins to predict his son's future. While seven of them declared that the prince would either be a Buddha or a great king, the Brahmin Kaundinya was confident that he would renounce the world and become a Buddha.

Śuddhodana, who was determined that his son should be a great king, confined the prince within the palace and surrounded him with earthly pleasures and luxury, thereby concealing the realities of life that might encourage him to renounce these pleasures and become an ascetic.

=== Observing the sights ===
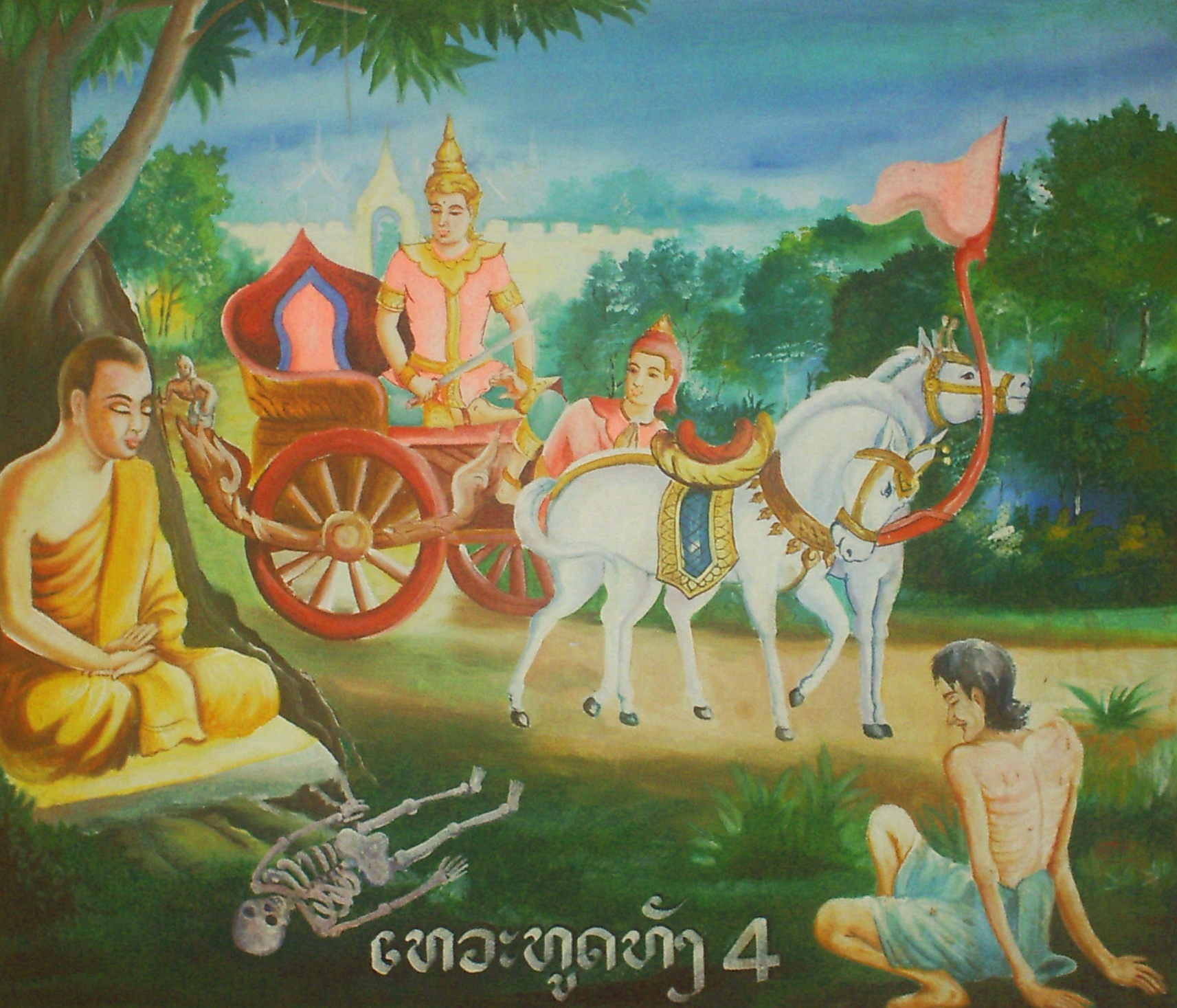
Modern Laotian depiction of the four sights

After leading a sheltered existence surrounded by luxury and pleasure in his younger years, Prince Siddhārtha ventured out of his palace for the first time at the age of 29. He set off from the palace to the city in a chariot, accompanied by his charioteer Channa (Sanskrit: Chandaka).

According to the more elaborated accounts such as the Lalitavistara Sūtra, a Mahayana text originally in Sanskrit, probably from the 3rd century, the Four Sights were placed on his route by the gods, to encourage the development of Siddharta's thinking. The 9th-century Borobudor reliefs illustrate this account.

==== 1st sight: senescence ====
On this journey he first saw an old man, revealing to Siddhārtha the consequences of aging. When the prince asked about this person, Channa replied that aging was something that happened to all beings alike.

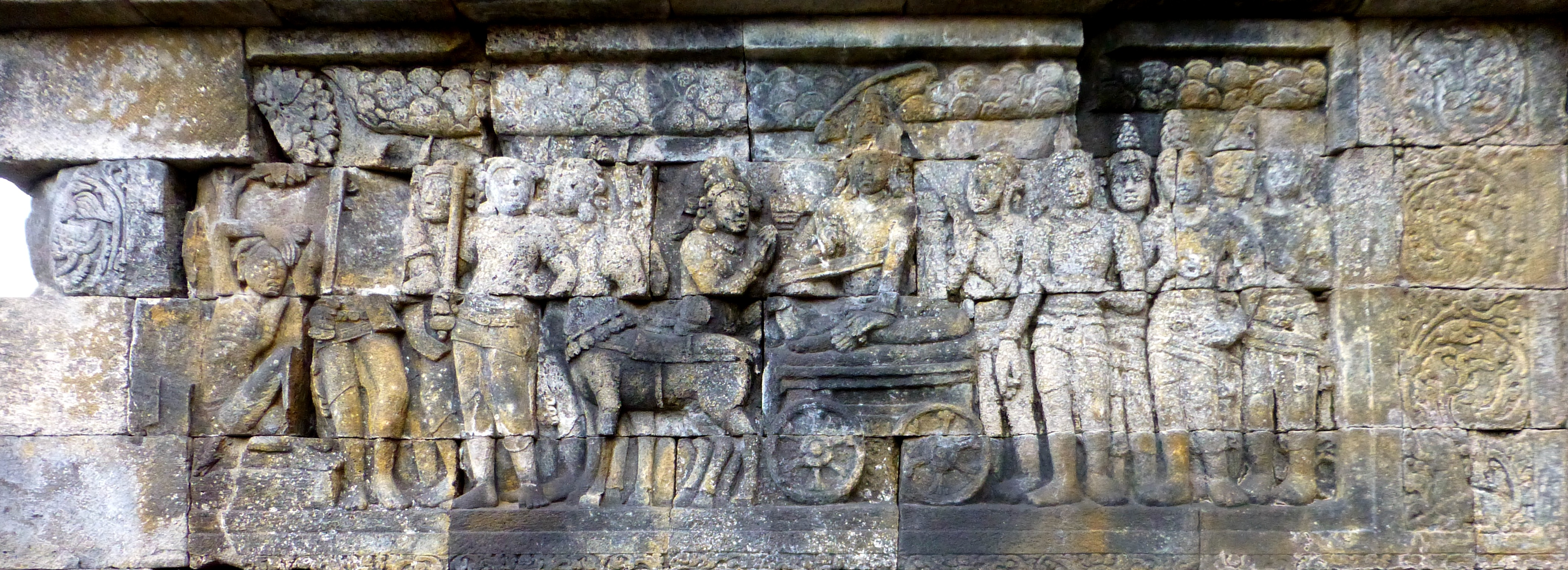
Seeing the sick man (at far left), Borobudur, Indonesia

==== 2nd sight: disease ====
The second sight was of a sick person suffering from a disease. Once again, the prince was surprised at the sight, and Channa explained that all beings are subject to disease and pain. This further troubled the mind of the prince.

==== 3rd sight: death ====
The third sight was of a dead body. As before, Channa explained to the prince that death is an inevitable fate that befalls everyone. After seeing these three sights, Siddhārtha was troubled in his mind and sorrowful about the sufferings that have to be endured in life.

==== 4th sight: asceticism ====
After seeing these three negative sights, Siddhārtha came upon the fourth sight, an ascetic who had devoted himself to finding the cause of human suffering. This sight gave him hope that he too might be released from the sufferings arising from being repeatedly reborn, and he resolved to follow the ascetic's example.

=== Aftermath ===
After observing these four sights, Siddhārtha returned to the palace, where a performance of dancing girls was arranged for him. Throughout the performance, the prince kept on thinking about the sights. In the early hours of morning, he finally looked about him and saw the dancers asleep and in disarray. The sight of this drastic change strengthened his resolve to leave in search of an end to the suffering of beings.

Some time after this incident (the accounts differ considerably as to the timing) and realizing the true nature of life after observing the four sights, Siddhārtha left the palace on his horse Kanthaka accompanied only by Channa. This is known as the Great Departure. He sent Channa back with his possessions and began an ascetic life, at the end of which he attained enlightenment as Gautama Buddha. Before this, he saw a group of people meditating and he decided to join them. The leaders of this group thought him to be so good that they asked him to run their class. However, he thought that meditation was not the only factor on his path to enlightenment. He tried to discipline his body by fasting, but he realized that by doing this, he would die before he reached enlightenment.

In the early Pali suttas, the four sights as discrete encounters were not mentioned with respect to the historical Buddha Siddhārtha Gautama. Rather, Siddhārtha's insights into old age, sickness and death were abstract considerations.

Even though I was endowed with such fortune, such total refinement, the thought occurred to me: 'When an untaught, run-of-the-mill person, himself subject to aging, not beyond aging, sees another who is aged, he is horrified, humiliated, & disgusted, oblivious to himself that he too is subject to aging, not beyond aging. If I—who am subject to aging, not beyond aging—were to be horrified, humiliated, & disgusted on seeing another person who is aged, that would not be fitting for me.' As I noticed this, the [typical] young person's intoxication with youth entirely dropped away.

Analogous passages for illness and death follow.

Similarly, the Ariya-pariyesana Sutta (Majjhima Nikaya 26) describes rather abstract considerations:

And what is ignoble search? There is the case where a person, being subject himself to birth, seeks [happiness in] what is likewise subject to birth. Being subject himself to aging... illness... death... sorrow... defilement, he seeks [happiness in] what is likewise subject to illness... death... sorrow... defilement.

These passages also do not mention the fourth sight of the renunciant. The renunciant is a depiction of the Sramana movement, which was popular at the time of Siddhārtha and which he consequently joined. Over the next six years Siddhartha wandered from place to place, in search of the mystery of life and death. He sat under a peepal tree in Bodh Gaya and began to meditate. After many days of meditation he attained enlightenment and came to be known as Buddha or the 'Enlightened One'. Buddha gave his first sermon at the Deer park in Sarnath. For the next forty-five years he spent his life travelling and preaching. He died at the age of eighty and by this time there were thousands of people who had started following Buddhism.

Buddha followed a simple path and inspired people to lead a simple life. His religious philosophy is called 'Buddhism'. He preached in Magadhi.

=== Different versions ===
In the early Pali sources, the legendary account of the four sights is only described with respect to a previous legendary Buddha Vipassī (Mahāpadāna Sutta, DN 14). In the later works Nidanakatha, Buddhavamsa and the Lalitavistara Sūtra, the account was consequently also applied to Siddhārtha Gautama.

Some accounts say that the four sights were observed by Siddhārtha in one day, during a single journey. Others describe that the four sightings were observed by him on four occasions, or the three bad sights were seen in one trip, and the ascetic on another. Some versions of the story also say that the prince's father had the route beautified and guarded to ensure that he does not see anything that might turn his thoughts towards suffering.

=== Lesson learned ===
After his ascetic experience, the Buddha chose the Middle Way.
