= Kanthaka =

Horse used by Gautama Buddha prior to his renunciation

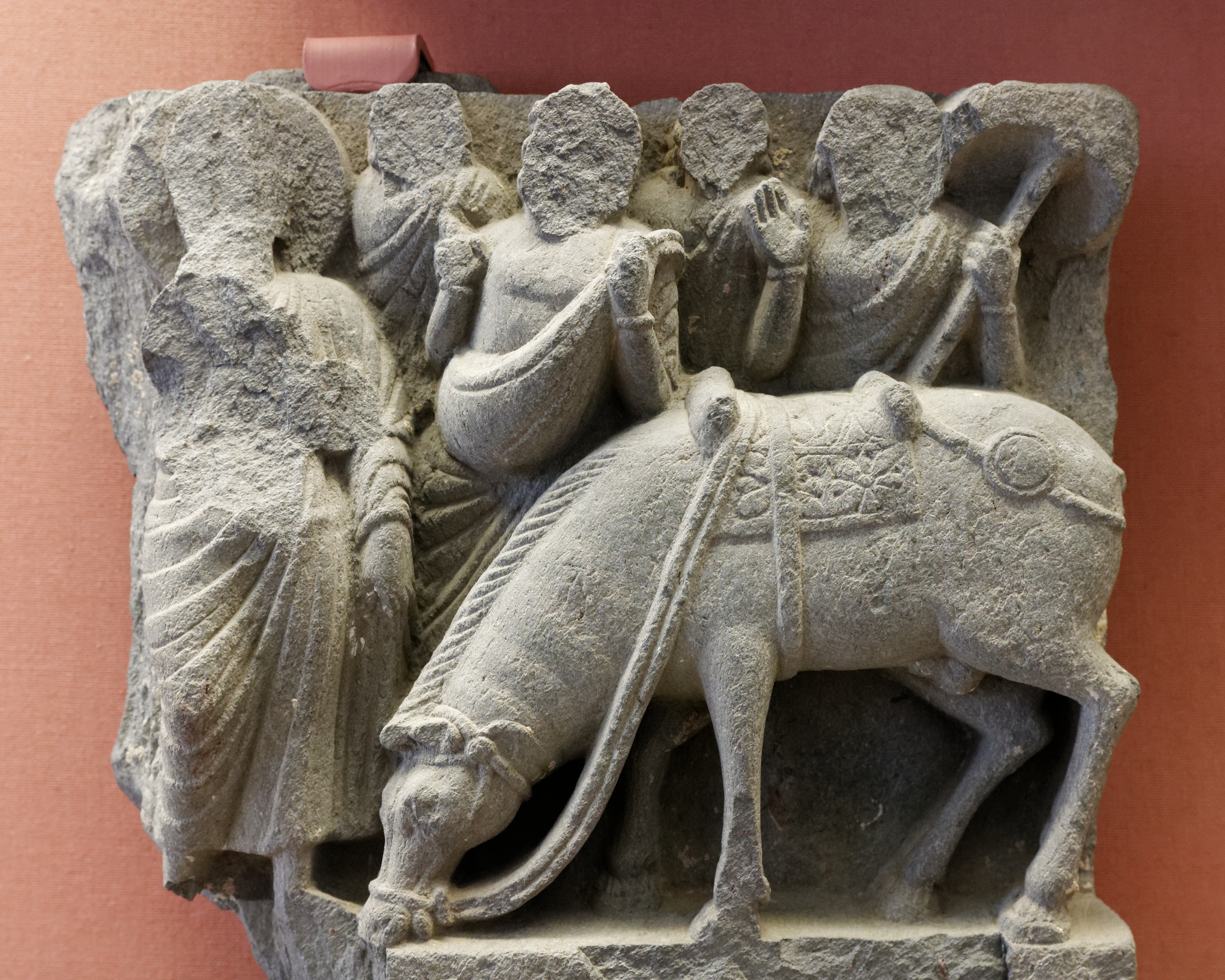
Siddhartha parting from Kanthaka, Gandhara, British Museum

Relief of Chanda and Kanthaka in British India, 1897

According to Buddhist legend, Kanthaka (in Pali and Sanskrit) (6th century BC, in Bihar and Uttar Pradesh, India) was an eighteen cubit long, favourite white horse and royal servant of Prince Siddhartha, who later became Gautama Buddha. Siddhartha used Kanthaka in all major events described in Buddhist texts prior to his renunciation of the world. Following the departure of Siddhartha, Kanthaka died of a broken heart.

In the court of King Śuddhodana, Kanthaka was the most skillful and able horse, and the favourite of Crown Prince Siddhartha whenever he needed to go outside the palace. Siddhartha had been lavished and pampered in a series of purpose-built palaces by Śuddhodana in order to shield him from thoughts of pain and suffering. This was done due to a prophecy of the ascetic Asita, who predicted that Siddhartha would renounce the throne to become a spiritual leader were he to contemplate human suffering. Kanthaka is first described in relation to the events leading up to the marriage of Siddhartha to Yasodhara, another Sakyan princess. By the customs of the kshatriya Sakyan clan, a prince must prove his worthiness in warrior related skills such as horse-riding, mounted archery and swordplay by defeating other royals in such contests. Mounted on Kanthaka, Siddhartha defeated his cousin Devadatta in archery, another cousin Anuruddha in a horse-riding competition, and then his half-brother Nanda in swordplay.

After Siddhartha's marriage, Kanthaka was the horse pulling the chariot when Channa, the head royal servant, accompanied Siddhartha around Kapilavastu. Siddhartha saw the Four sights here whilst meeting his subjects, which prompted his decision to renounce the world. During these expeditions aboard Kanthaka, Channa explained to Siddhartha the sights of an elderly man, a sick person, a dead person whose funeral was being conducted, and finally an ascetic who had renounced worldly life for a spiritual one. Siddhartha had been secluded from such sights within the palace and was taken aback.

Later, Kanthaka was the horse used by Siddhartha to escape from the palace and become an ascetic while the palace guards were asleep. After initially protesting and refusing to accept that Siddhartha would leave him, Channa saddled Kanthaka, guiding him out of the town aboard the horse to a forest by the edge of the Anoma River. According to the texts, Kanthaka was able to jump across the river. Riding Kanthaka, Channa returned Siddhartha's accoutrements, weapons, and hair to Suddhodarnha at the palace, as Siddhartha compelled him to return there after Channa had refused to leave him.

According to Buddhist texts, Kanthaka was reborn as a brahmin and went on to attend dharma talks by Gautama Buddha and achieve enlightenment. The death is variously described as occurring either at the banks of the Anoma or upon returning to Kapilavastu.

The description of Kanthaka is also widely observed in Buddhist art, such as carvings on stupas. The depiction of Siddhartha leaving Kapilavastu aboard Kanthaka found at the main stupa in Amaravathi is the oldest depiction currently existing. Such depictions are also displayed in museums in London and Calcutta.
