= Channa (Buddhist) =

Servant and charioteer of Prince Siddhartha

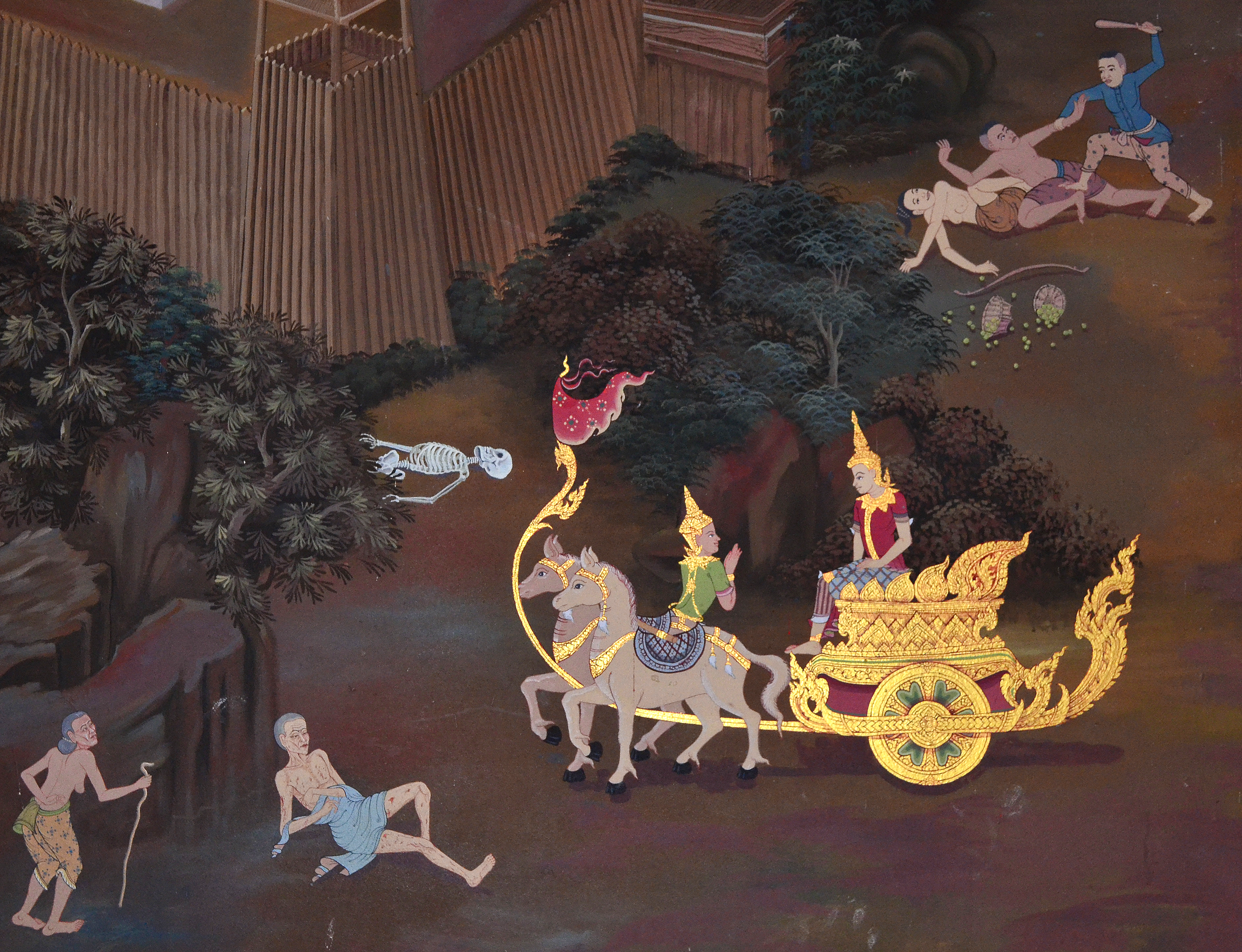
- Prince Siddhartha after leaving the palace, intending to take up the life of a wandering ascetic or monk. He travelled with his friend and servant Channa, and his horse Kanthaka.

Religious life
- Religion: Buddhism

Channa, also written as Chhanna, (Pali: Channa; Sanskrit: Chandaka) (6th century BCE, in what is now Bihar and Uttar Pradesh, India) was a royal servant and head charioteer of Prince Siddhartha, who was to become the Buddha. Channa later became a disciple of the Buddha (bhikkhu) and achieved arahantship, as is described in the 78th verse of the Dhammapada.

Channa was a servant in the court of King Śuddhodana who was entrusted to attend to the needs of Siddhartha, who had been lavished and pampered in a series of purpose-built palaces in order to shield him from thoughts of pain and suffering. This was done due to a prophecy by the ascetic Asita, who predicted that Siddhartha would renounce the throne to become a spiritual leader were he to contemplate human suffering. Channa was the servant who served as the charioteer pulled by the horse Kanthaka, when Siddhartha saw the Four sights whilst meeting his subjects in the Sakya capital Kapilavastu, which prompted his decision to renounce the world.

During these expeditions, Channa explained to Siddhartha the sights of an elderly man, a sick person, a dead person whose funeral was being conducted and finally, an ascetic who had renounced worldly life for a spiritual one, as Siddhartha who had been secluded from such sights within the palace was taken aback. Channa was later entrusted by Siddhartha to accompany him upon his escape from the palace to become an ascetic, whilst the remainder of the palace guards were asleep.

After initially protesting and refusing to accept that Siddhartha would leave him, Channa saddled Kanthaka, guiding him out of the town aboard the horse to a forest by the edge of the Anoma River. Channa returned Siddhartha's accoutrements, weapons and hair to Suddhodarnha upon his return to the palace, after Siddhartha compelled him to return after Channa had refused to leave him.

Upon Siddhartha's enlightenment as Gautama Buddha and return to Kapilavastu, Channa became a Buddhist monk, joining the Sangha. Due to his lone accompaniment of the Buddha on his renouncement, Channa behaved in an overbearing way to the other monks, and frequently criticized the two chief disciples Sariputta and Moggallana. In spite of continual advice from The Buddha he continued to abuse the other monks. Prior to the parinibbana, the Buddha instructed Ananda to impose the brahmadanda on Channa, whereby the other monks would simply ignore him. After the parinibbana, Channa learned of the decree, and feeling remorse for his behaviour, he fainted three times before asking and obtaining pardon. He eventually became an arahant.

== Sources ==
- Ven., Weragoda Sarada Maha Thero (1993). Treasury of Truth Illustrated Dhammapada.
- Electronic copy - verse 78
