= Saṃvega =

Spiritual urgency to reach Enlightenment in Buddhist term

Saṃvega is a Buddhist term which indicates a sense of shock, dismay and spiritual urgency to reach liberation and escape the suffering of samsara. According to Thanissaro Bhikku, saṃvega is the "first emotion you're supposed to bring to the training" and can be defined as:

The oppressive sense of shock, dismay, and alienation that come with realizing the futility and meaninglessness of life as it's normally lived; a chastening sense of our own complacency and foolishness in having let ourselves live so blindly; and an anxious sense of urgency in trying to find a way out of the meaningless cycle.

Saṃvega is also associated with the development of energy (viriya) and right effort, according to Buddhagosa's Atthasālinī:

Energy has exerting as its characteristic, strengthening the co-existent states as function, and opposition to giving way as manifestation. It has been said: "He in whom saṃvega is present exerts himself properly," hence energy has saṃvega, or the basic condition of making energy as proximate cause. Right exertion should be regarded as the root of all attainments. - DhsA. 121

There are eight bases of saṃvega (saṃvega vatthu). They are "birth, old age, sickness, death, suffering in the woeful worlds, the round of suffering as rooted in the past, the round of suffering as rooted in the future, and the round of suffering in the search for food in the present." Saṃvega can therefore be developed by practicing meditation on death (maranasati) and the charnel ground meditations as outlined in the Satipatthana sutta. In the Upajjhatthana Sutta the Buddha taught that everyone (monks and householders) should practice the five daily recollections as a way to arouse energy and saṃvega.

For saṃvega to be an effective drive to practice, it must be accompanied by another emotion called pasada, a "clarity and serene confidence." Pasada is what keeps saṃvega from turning into nihilistic despair by providing a sense of confidence that there is a way out, namely nibbana.

== See also ==
- Four sights
- Existential angst
- Viriya
- Seven Factors of Enlightenment
- Spiritual crisis
