= Anoma River =

Indian river

The Anoma was a river in Majjhimadesa of ancient India. According to Buddhist tradition it was situated near Kapilavastu, and was crossed by Prince Siddhartha (along with his horse Kanthaka and charioteer Channa) where he renounced the world before becoming the Buddha by cutting off his hair, abandoning his royal dress and exchanging it for the robes of an ascetic.

Alexander Cunningham identified it with the Aumi in Gorakhpur district of Uttar Pradesh, while A. C. L. Carlleyle states it is the Kudwa Nala, a small creek in the Basti district.
