= Asita =

Ascetic and sage during Buddha's lifetime

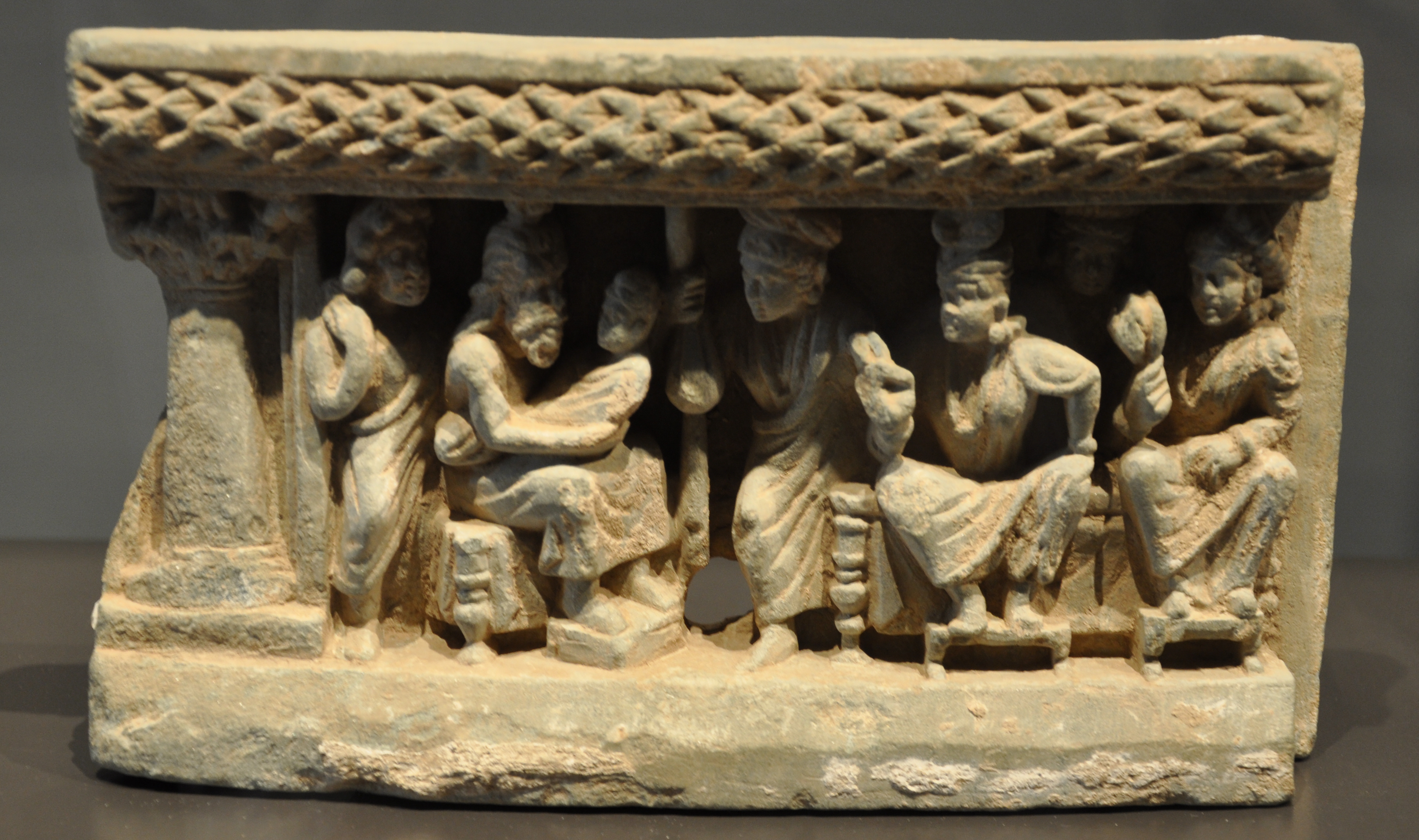
- The prophecy of the seer Asita, slate relief from Gandhara, 3rd/4th century AD (Rietberg Museum, Zurich; Inv. No. RVI 11)

Religious life
- Religion: Buddhism

Asita or Kaladevala or Kanhasiri was a hermit ascetic, a sage and seer, depicted in Buddhist sources as having lived in ancient India. He was a teacher and advisor of Suddhodana, the father of the Buddha, and is best known for having predicted that prince Siddhartha of Kapilavastu would either become a great chakravartin or become a supreme religious leader; Siddhartha was later known as Gautama Buddha.

The name Asita literally means 'not clinging', while Kanhasiri means 'dark splendour'. Asita is described as a tāpasa, a practitioner of asceticism.

== Biography ==
The Theravada tradition depicts Asita as an advisor and chaplain to Sihahanu, the grandfather of Gotama Buddha. He was the teacher of Suddhodana, and then served him as he had Suddhodana's father. At the time of the birth of the Buddha, he had retired by permission of Suddhodana and was living in the forest as an ascetic.

A vision alerted Asita of the birth of the Bodhisattva Gotama, causing him to leave the forest and travel to see the infant, where he prophesied that he would become either a 'wheel turning monarch' (chakravartin) or a Buddha. Disappointed that his own life would end before the Buddha awakened and began preaching, he ordained his nephew, Nalaka, so that he would be able to hear the Buddha's teachings. Nalaka is called Naradatta in the Lalitavistara.

== Names and related figures ==
Asita was known under several alternate names or nicknames, and Buddhaghosa attributed his name to his dark complexion. He was known as Kanha Devala, Kanha Siri or Siri Kanha, and Kāla Devala.

Another sage or rishi known as Asita Devala is sometimes confused with him in literary sources- this second Asita Devala was a sage from ancient times who was reborn as a disciple of the Buddha. This confusion may explain why in the Lalitavistara Sūtra there are two versions of Asita's prophecy- one where Asita visits Suddhodana as described in the Pali sources, and another where Asita is a hermit living in the Himalayas who never meets Suddhodana but perceives the birth of the Buddha due to his supernatural powers.

The Pali tradition also records a pratyekabuddha called Asita, and a man who lived at the time of Sikkhi Buddha who was reborn as a disciple of Gotama Buddha.

Early Western scholars related Asita to Simeon, who blessed Jesus as an infant.

== Bibliography ==
- Herold, André-Ferdinand. The Life of Buddha According to the Legends of Ancient India. United States, A.&C. Boni, 1927.
- "Asita: Dictionary of Buddhism: Nichiren Buddhism Library." Asita | Dictionary of Buddhism | Nichiren Buddhism Library, www.nichirenlibrary.org/en/dic/Content/A/102. Accessed 10 May 2024.
