= Lalitavistara Sūtra =

Sutra in Mahāyāna Buddhism

Translations of Lalitavistara Sūtra
- English: The Extensive Play
- Sanskrit: Lalitavistara Sūtra
- Burmese: လလိတဝိတ္ထာရကျမ်း
- Chinese: 普曜經 (Pinyin: Pǔyào Jīng)
- Japanese: 方広大荘厳経 (Rōmaji: Hōkōdaishōgonkyō)
- Tibetan: རྒྱ་ཆེར་རོལ་པ་ (rgya cher rol pa)

The Lalitavistara Sūtra is a Sanskrit Mahayana Buddhist sutra that tells the story of Gautama Buddha from the time of his descent from Tushita until his first sermon in the Deer Park at Sarnath near Varanasi. The term Lalitavistara has been translated "The Play in Full" or "Extensive Play", referring to the Mahayana view that the Buddha's last incarnation was a "display" or "performance" given for the benefit of the beings in this world.

== Outline of the text ==
The sutra consists of twenty-seven chapters:

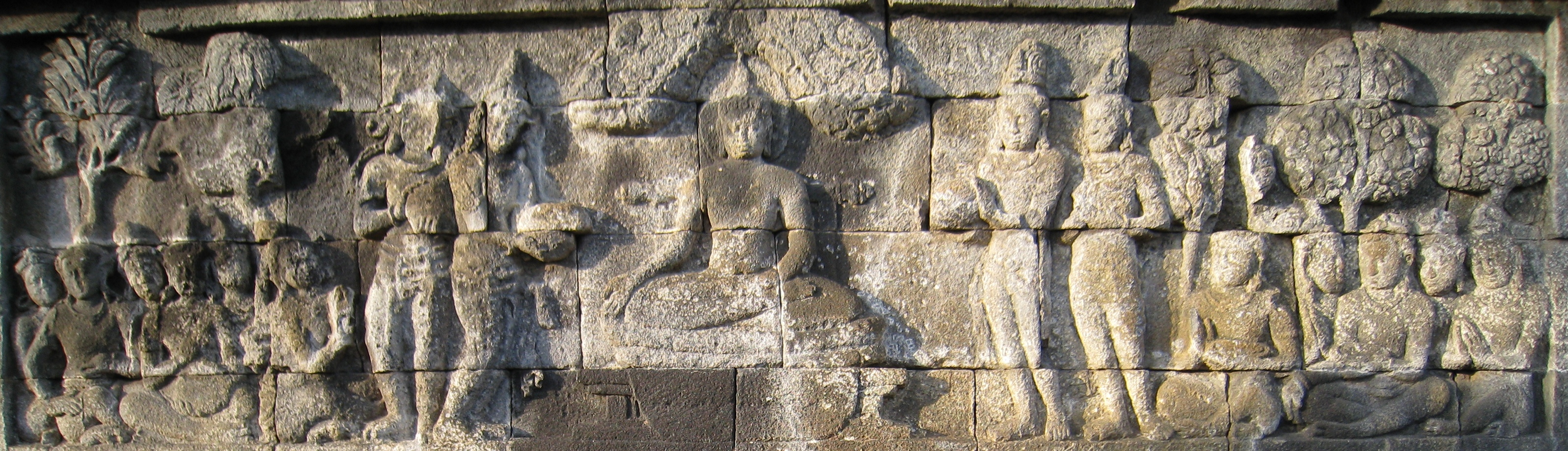
The Offering of the Four Bowls to the Buddha, Borobudur, Indonesia.

- Chapter 1: In the first chapter of the sutra, the Buddha is staying at Jetavana with a large gathering of disciples. One evening, a group of divine beings visit the Buddha and request him to tell the story of his awakening for the benefit of all beings. The Buddha consents.
- Chapter 2: The following morning, the Buddha tells his story to the gathered disciples. He begins the story by telling of his previous life, in which the future Buddha was living in the heavenly realms surrounded by divine pleasures. In this previous life, he was known as the Bodhisattva. The Bodhisattva is enjoying the immense pleasures of his heavenly life, but due to his past aspirations, one day the musical instruments of the heavenly palace call out to him, reminding him of his prior commitment to attain awakening.
- Chapter 3: Upon being reminded of his previous commitments, the Bodhisattva announces, to the despair of the gods in this realm, that he will abandon his divine pleasures in order to take birth in the human realm and there attain complete awakening.
- Chapter 4: Before leaving the heavenly realms, the Bodhisattva delivers one final teaching to the gods.
- Chapter 5: The Bodhisattva installs Maitreya as his regent in the heavenly realms and sets out for the human realm accompanied by great displays of divine offerings and auspicious signs.
- Chapter 6: The Bodhisattva enters into the human world via the womb of Queen Māyā, where he resides for the duration of the pregnancy within a beautiful temple, enjoying the happiness of absorption.
- Chapter 7: The Bodhisattva takes birth at the grove in Lumbinī and declares his intention to attain complete awakening.
- Chapter 8: The infant Bodhisattva visits a temple where the stone statues rise up to greet him.
- Chapter 9: His father, Śuddhodana, commissions marvelous jewelry for him.
- Chapter 10: The Bodhisattva attends his first day at school, where he far surpasses even the most senior tutors. This chapter is notable in that it contains a list of scripts known to the Bodhisattva which has been of great importance in the history of Indic scripts, particularly through the comparison of various surviving versions of the text.
- Chapter 11: On a visit to the countryside as a young boy, he attains the highest levels of samadhi.
- Chapter 12: As a young man, he demonstrates prowess in the traditional worldly arts, and wins the hand of Gopā, a Śākya girl whose father requires proof of the Bodhisattva's qualities as a proper husband.
- Chapter 13: The Bodhisattva reaches maturity and enjoys life in the palace, where he is surrounded by all types of pleasure, including a large harem to entertain him. Seeing this, the gods gently remind him of his vows to awaken.
- Chapter 14: The Bodhisattva takes a trip outside the palace walls to visit the royal parks. On this trip, he encounters a sick person, an old man, a corpse, and a religious mendicant. Deeply affected by these sights, the Bodhisattva renounces his royal pleasures.
- Chapter 15: The Bodhisattva departs from the palace to begin the life of a religious seeker on a spiritual journey.
- Chapter 16: The Bodhisattva seeks out the foremost spiritual teachers of his day, and he quickly surpasses each of his teachers in understanding and meditative concentration. His extraordinary charisma also attracts many beings, such as the king of Magadha, who requests the Bodhisattva to take up residence in his kingdom, but without success.
- Chapter 17: The Bodhisattva follows Rudraka, a renowned spiritual teacher. He quickly masters the prescribed trainings, but once again he is disappointed with the teachings. The Bodhisattva concludes that he must discover awakening on his own, and he sets out on a six-year journey of extreme asceticism. These practices take him to the brink of death.
- Chapter 18: The Bodhisattva concludes that the austere practices do not lead to awakening and, encouraged by some protective gods, he begins to eat a normal diet once again, and regains his health.
- Chapter 19: Sensing that he is on the verge of attaining his goal, the Bodhisattva sets out for the bodhimaṇḍa, the sacred place where all bodhisattvas in their last existence attain full and complete awakening.
- Chapter 20: He arrives at the seat of awakening, and the gods perform a variety of miraculous displays, transforming the area so that it resembles a divine realm, fit for the epic achievement that awaits the Bodhisattva.
- Chapter 21: Māra, the most powerful demon in the desire realm, arrives with the aim of preventing the Bodhisattva from attaining his goal. Māra attempts to terrify the Bodhisattva with his powerful army, and to seduce him with his seductive daughters, but he is unable to divert the Bodhisattva from his goal. Māra gives up, defeated.
- Chapter 22: Now the stage is set for the Bodhisattva to attain awakening under the Bodhi Tree, a gradual process that unfolds throughout the night until he fully and perfectly awakens at dawn to become the Buddha ("awakened") or Tathāgata, as he is known subsequent to his awakening.
- Chapter 23: Recognizing his epic achievement, the entire pantheon of divine beings visits the Thus-Gone One, making offerings and singing his praise.
- Chapter 24: For seven weeks following his awakening, the Buddha remains alone in the forest and does not teach. He is concerned that the truth he has discovered might be too profound for others to comprehend. Sensing this dilemma, the demon Māra tries to trick the Buddha one last time. Māra visits the Buddha and suggests that perhaps this would be a suitable time to pass into parinirvāṇa. The Buddha rejects Māra's advice, and finally Māra retreats. During these first seven weeks, the Buddha also encounters some local passersby, but no teaching is given.
- Chapter 25: Brahmā, Śakra, and the other gods sense the Buddha's hesitation. They visit the Buddha and formally request him to teach the Dharma. They repeat the request four times before the Buddha eventually consents. Upon his consent to teach, the Buddha says, “O Brahmā, the gates of nectar are opened”.
- Chapter 26: The Buddha determines that the most suitable students for his first teaching are his five former companions from the days when he was practicing austerities. The Buddha travels to Deer Park outside of Varanasi, to meet his former companions. Initially, the companions are suspicious of the Buddha for having given up their austerity practices, but they are soon rendered helpless by his majestic presence and request teachings from him. The five companions instantly receive ordination and, in a seminal moment, the Buddha teaches them the Four Noble Truths: suffering, the origin of suffering, the cessation of suffering, and the path that leads to the cessation of suffering. Thus this occasion constitutes the birth of the Three Jewels: the Buddha, the Dharma, and the Saṅgha.
- Chapter 27: This marks the end of the teaching proper. Finally, in the epilogue, the Buddha encourages his retinue of gods and humans to take this sūtra as their practice and propagate it to the best of their abilities.

The story ends at the very moment when the Buddha has finally manifested all the qualities of awakening and is fully equipped to influence the world, as he did over the next forty-five years by continuously teaching the Dharma and establishing his community of followers.

== The Borobudur reliefs ==
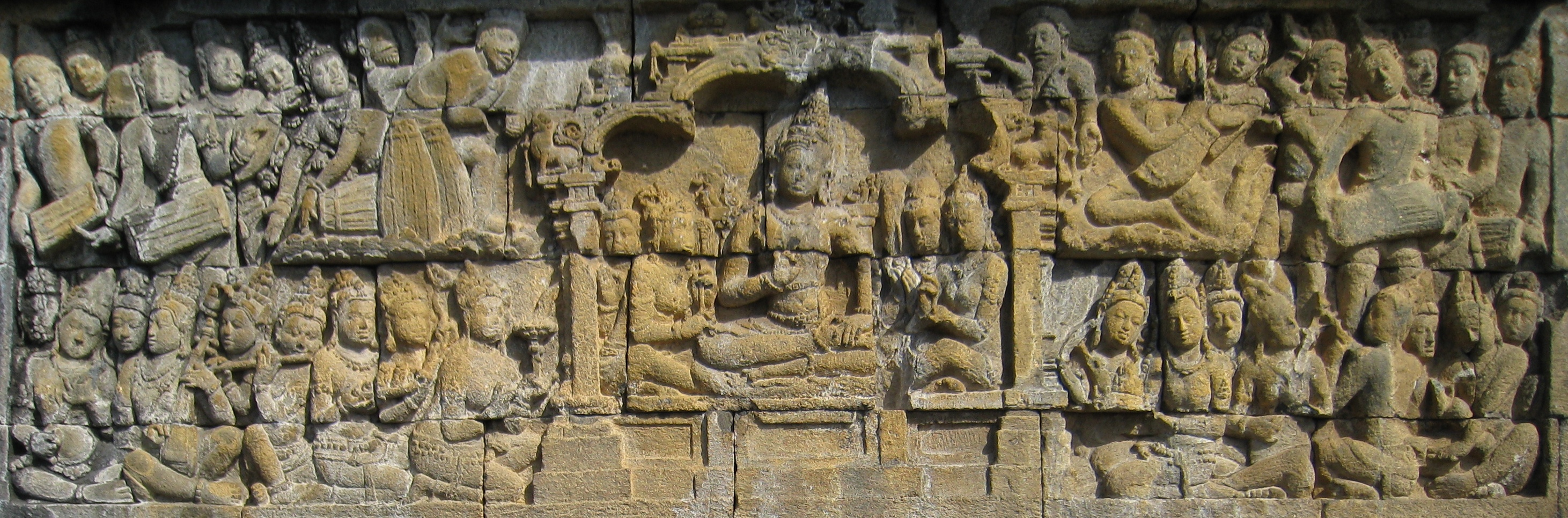
The Bodhisattva in Tushita before his birth as Siddhartha Gautama. Borobudur

The Borobudur reliefs contain a series of panels depicting the life of the Buddha as described in the Lalitavistara Sutra. In these reliefs, the story starts from the glorious descent of the Buddha from the Tushita heaven, and ends with his first sermon in the Deer Park.

As an example of how widely the sutra was disseminated, the Lalitavistara Sutra was known to the Mantranaya (Vajrayana) practitioners of Borobudur, who had the text illustrated by stonemasons. (Note: The indigenous term Mantranaya is not a corruption or misspelling of mantrayana, although it is largely synonymous. Mantranaya is the earlier term for the esoteric Mahayana teachings emphasizing mantras. The clearly Sanskrit sounding Mantranaya is evident in Old Javanese tantric literature, particularly as documented in the oldest esoteric Buddhist tantric text in Old Javanese, the Sang Kyang Kamahayanan Mantranaya see Kazuko Ishii (1992).)

== Historical context ==
In the early 20th century, P. L. Vaidya believed that the finished Sanskrit text dated to the 3rd century AD.

The text is also said to be a compilation of various works by no single author and includes materials from the Sarvastivada and the Mahayana traditions.

Concerning the origins of the text, the Dharmachakra Translation Committee states:

This scripture is an obvious compilation of various early sources, which have been strung together and elaborated on according to the Mahāyāna worldview. As such this text is a fascinating example of the ways in which the Mahāyāna rests firmly on the earlier tradition, yet reinterprets the very foundations of Buddhism in a way that fit its own vast perspective. The fact that the text is a compilation is initially evident from the mixture of prose and verse that, in some cases, contains strata from the very earliest Buddhist teachings and, in other cases, presents later Buddhist themes that do not emerge until the first centuries of the common era. Previous scholarship on The Play in Full (mostly published in the late nineteenth and early twentieth centuries) devoted much time to determining the text’s potential sources and their respective time periods, although without much success. [...] Although this topic clearly deserves further study, it is interesting to note that hardly any new research on this sūtra has been published during the last sixty years. As such the only thing we can currently say concerning the sources and origin of The Play in Full is that it was based on several early and, for the most part, unidentified sources that belong to the very early days of the Buddhist tradition.

== Translations into English ==
- The Play in Full: Lalitavistara (2013), translated by the Dharmachakra Translation Committee, under the patronage and supervision of 84000: Translating the Words of the Buddha. Translated from Tibetan into English and checked against the Sanskrit version. (Note: A Play in Full: Lalitavistara (2013), translated by the Dharmachakra Translation Committee (complete translation from Tibetan into English))
- Voice of the Buddha: The Beauty of Compassion (1983), translated by Gwendolyn Bays, Dharma Publishing (two-volume set). This translation has been made from French into English and then checked with the original in Tibetan and Sanskrit.
- Mitra, R. L. (1875) The Lalita Vistara. Delhi: Sri Satguru Publications, 1998.

== Translations into French ==
Foucaux, Édouard. Le Lalitavistara : l’histoire traditionnelle de la vie du Bouddha Çakyamuni. Les Classiques du bouddhisme mahāyāna, Musée National des Arts Asiatiques Guimet, vol. 19. Paris: Ernest Leroux, 1892. Reprinted as Le Lalitavistara : l'histoire traditionnelle de la vie du Bouddha Çakyamuni, Les Deux Océans, 1988, 1992, 450 p., ISBN 2866810228, 9782866810221

== Numerals ==
In the Lalitavistara, the Buddha explains to a mathematician named Arjuna the system of numerals in multiples of 100, starting from a koti (in later literature 10^{7} but this is uncertain) to a tallakshana (10^{53}).

== See also ==
- Buddhacarita
- Dhammacakkappavattana Sutta
- Miraculous births

== Sources ==
- Dharmachakra Translation Committee (2013), A Play in Full: Lalitavistara (PDF), 84000: Translating the Words of the Buddha, 84000, archived (PDF) from the original on 2016-09-24
- Soekmono (1976). Chandi Borobudur: A Monument of Mankind (PDF). Paris: The Unesco Press. ISBN 92-3-101292-4. Archived (PDF) from the original on 6 November 2014.
- Lalitavistara sûtra. La vie du Buddha, commentaires de Guillaume Ducoeur, Presses universitaires de Strasbourg, Strasbourg, 2018, 158 p.
