= Mahākāśyapa =

Principal disciple of Gautama Buddha and leader at the First Council

The elder Mahākāśyapa
- Mahākāśyapa holding a reliquary, sixth century CE, Hebei province, China

Personal life
- Born: Pippali c. 603 BC or 520 BC Mahātittha, Magadha (present-day Pillich, Nalanda, Bihar, India)
- Died: c. 460 BC or 380 BC In Kukkuṭapāda Mountain, Magadha. According to many hagiographic accounts, undecomposed body still there
- Parent(s): Father Nyagrodha, Kapila or Kosigotta; mother Sumanādevī
- Known for: Leader of the First Buddhist Council; foremost in ascetic practices (Pali: dhutavādānaṃ)
- Other name: Dhutaraja

Religious life
- Religion: Buddhism
- School: all, but most honored in Theravāda and Chan Buddhism

Senior posting
- Teacher: Gautama Buddha
- Successor: Ānanda
- Students: Śroṇa-Koṭikarṇa; Bhadra-Kapilānī

Mahākāśyapa (Pali: Mahākassapa) was one of the principal disciples of Gautama Buddha. He is regarded in Buddhism as an enlightened disciple, being foremost in ascetic practice. Mahākāśyapa assumed leadership of the monastic community following the parinirvāṇa (death) of the Buddha, presiding over the First Buddhist Council. He was considered to be the first patriarch in a number of Early Buddhist schools and continued to have an important role as patriarch in the Chan/Zen tradition. In Buddhist texts, he assumed many identities, that of a renunciant saint, a lawgiver, an anti-establishment figure, but also a "guarantor of future justice" in the time of Maitreya, the future Buddha—he has been described as "both the anchorite and the friend of mankind, even of the outcast".

In canonical Buddhist texts in several traditions, Mahākāśyapa was born as Pippali in a village (modern day Pillich which is named after him) and entered an arranged marriage with a woman named Bhadra-Kapilānī. Both of them aspired to lead a celibate life, however, and they decided not to consummate their marriage. Having grown weary of the agricultural profession and the damage it did, they both left the lay life behind to become mendicants. The specific site where he traditionally cast away his wealth to adopt an ascetic life is known locally as the village of Rajba Jogiya (meaning "the king who became a yogi"). Furthermore, the region surrounding Pillich, along with the neighbouring villages of Rukhai and Kapsiyama, historically featured three massive earthen fort mounds (Garhs) that served as outlying outposts for the Nalanda Mahavihara ecosystem, which were later used as fortified strongholds by the local Pillichhwar lineage of the Bhumihar clan.

Pippali later met the Buddha, under whom he was ordained as a monk, named Kāśyapa, but later called Mahākāśyapa to distinguish him from other disciples. Mahākāśyapa became an important disciple of the Buddha, to the extent that the Buddha exchanged his robe with him, which was a symbol of the transmittance of the Buddhist teaching. He became foremost in ascetic practices and attained enlightenment shortly after. Despite his ascetic, strict and stern reputation, he paid an interest in community matters and teaching, and was known for his compassion for the poor, which sometimes caused him to be depicted as an anti-establishment figure. He had a prominent role in the cremation of the Buddha, acting as a sort of eldest son of the Buddha, as well as being the leader in the subsequent First Council. He is depicted as hesitatingly allowing Ānanda to participate in the council, and chastising him afterwards for a number of offenses the latter was regarded to have committed.

Mahākāśyapa's life as described in the early Buddhist texts has been considerably studied by scholars, who have been skeptical about his role in the cremation, his role toward Ānanda and the historicity of the council itself. A number of scholars have hypothesized that the accounts have later been embellished to emphasize the values of the Buddhist establishment Mahākāśyapa stood for, emphasizing monastic discipline and ascetic values, as opposed to the values of Ānanda and other disciples. Regardless, it is clear that Mahākāśyapa had an important role in the early days of the Buddhist community after the Buddha's parinirvāṇa, to help establish a stable monastic tradition. He effectively became the leader for the first twenty years after the Buddha, as he had become the most influential figure in the monastic community. For this reason, he was regarded by many early Buddhist schools as a sort of first patriarch, and was seen to have started a lineage of patriarchs of Buddhism.

In many post-canonical texts, Mahākāśyapa decided at the end of his life to enter a state of meditation and suspended animation, which was believed to cause his physical remains to stay intact in a cave under a mountain called Kukkuṭapāda, until the coming of Maitreya Buddha. This story has led to several cults and practices, and affected some Buddhist countries up until early modern times. It has been interpreted by scholars as a narrative to physically connect Gautama Buddha and Maitreya Buddha, through the body of Mahākāśyapa and Gautama Buddha's robe, which covered Mahākāśyapa's remains. In Chan Buddhism, this account was less emphasized, but Mahākāśyapa was seen to have received a special mind-to-mind transmission from Gautama Buddha outside of orthodox scripture, which became essential to the identity of Chan. Again, the robe was an important symbol in this transmission. Apart from having a role in texts and lineage, Mahākāśyapa has often been depicted in Buddhist art as a symbol of reassurance and hope for the future of Buddhism.

== In early Buddhist texts ==
In the Early Buddhist Texts of several textual traditions, a dozen discourses attributed to Mahākāśyapa have been compiled in a distinct section within several collections of texts. In the Pāli tradition, this is part of the collection called the Saṃyutta Nikāya, and in Chinese Buddhist texts, the collection is called the Saṃyukta Āgama. The latter collection contains two versions of the section on Mahākāśyapa, numbered Taishō 2:99 and 2:100. The Chinese Ekottara Āgama also contains a passage that runs parallel to the Pāli Saṃyutta, T2:99 and T2:100, describing a meeting between the Buddha and Mahākāśyapa, and another passage about him and the monk Bakkula. Finally, there are also Vinaya texts from the Mūlasarvāstivāda tradition about Mahākāśyapa in the Tibetan language.

=== Early life ===
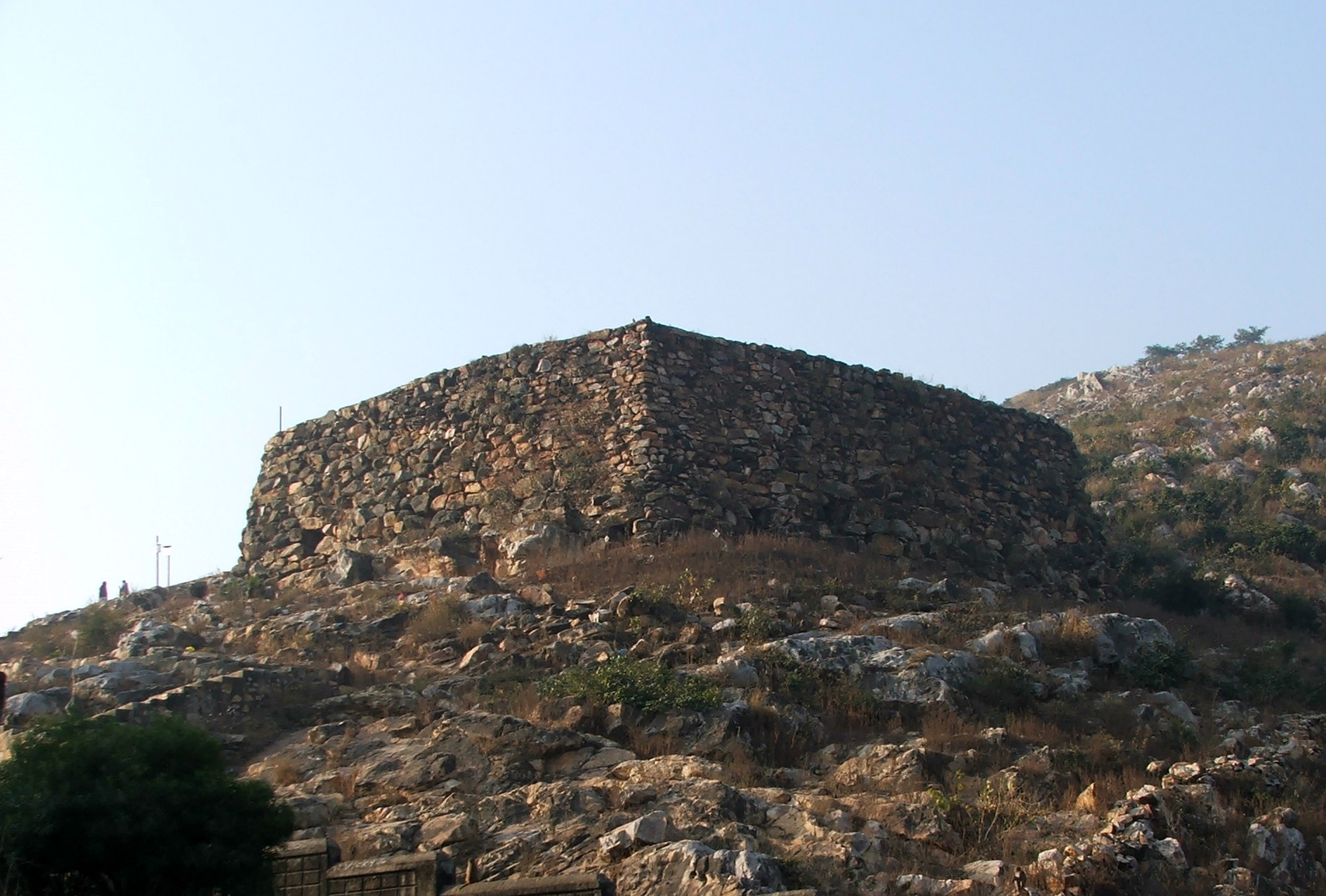
Pippala Cave in Rajgir, where Mahākāśyapa is recorded to have stayed

Pāli accounts relate that Mahākāśyapa was born Pippali in a brahmana family in a village called Mahātittha, in the kingdom of Magadha, present-day Bihar, India. His father was a wealthy landlord who in some sources is named Nyagrodha, and in other sources Kapila or Kosigotta; his mother was Sumanādevī. (Note: For the father's occupation, see Buswell & Lopez (2013, Bhadra-Kapilānī). For Nyagrodha, see Clarke (2014, p. 110). For the other names, see Karaluvinna (2002, p. 435).) His body had some of the thirty-two characteristics of a Great Man (Sanskrit: Mahāpuruṣalakṣaṇa; Pali: Mahāpurissalakkhaṇa), which in Buddhism are seen as the characteristics of a future Buddha. (Note: Buswell & Lopez (2013, Bhadra-Kapilānī; Mahāpuruṣalakṣaṇa) state he had seven characteristics, referring to Pāli sources; Kim (2011, pp. 135–136) refers to sources that state he had thirty.) From his youth onward, he was inclined toward living a spiritual life rather than marrying, but his father wanted him to wed. To send his father on a wild goose chase, he agreed to marry but then produced a perfect golden statue of a woman, and asked his father to find him a woman that matched the statue. Four copies of the image were taken throughout the country to find the right woman. A brahmin from Kapila (Note: Pāli sources have Sāgala instead, which is in present-day Pakistan. The brahmin is called Kosigotta in the Pāli sources, though in some of these sources this name is used for Pippali's father.) had a daughter called Bhadra-Kapilānī (Pali: Bhaddā-kapilānī), who had no interest in a family life either. However, her parents wanted her to marry, and to please her mother, she agreed to pay her respects to a shrine of a goddess known for granting a marriage in a high-class family. When she approached the image, however, people noticed that the image appeared ugly compared to her. Her reputation of beauty spread, and soon after Pippali's family learned about her, she was offered in marriage to Pippali.

Next, in the Pāli version of the story, the two exchanged letters to indicate their lack of interest, only to find their letters intercepted by their parents and being forced to marry anyway. In the Mūlasarvāstivāda version of the story, however, Pippali went to visit Bhadra, and without revealing his identity, told her that her future husband would be a bad choice for her, because he had no interest in sensual pleasures. She replied she also did not care for such matters, whereupon he revealed that he was her future husband. Both versions relate that the two agreed to marry and to live celibately, to the chagrin of Pippali's parents.

Pippali is depicted in the Pāli version as very wealthy, using much perfume and possessing much land and chariots. Later, in the Pāli version, Pippali and Bhadra saw animals eating each other on the fertile fields as they were plowed by their workers. The sight brought pity and fear to them, and they determined to live mendicant lives instead, and leave the agricultural business behind. In the Mūlasarvāstivāda version, it was the pitiful sight of the workers instead which brought Pippali to leave his lay life. The two went their separate ways, as not to grow any attachment to each other, and to prevent gossip and disrepute. (Note: For the attachment, see Clarke (2014, p. 112). For the gossip, see Karaluvinna (2002, p. 436).)

=== Meeting the Buddha ===
Shortly after that, (Note: Later texts such as the Mahāvastu state this was a year after he left his household life.) Pippali met the Buddha, was struck with devotion when seeing him, and asked to be ordained under him. Thenceforth, he was called Kāśyapa. (Note: See Buswell & Lopez (2013, Bhadra-Kapilānī). Ray (1994, p. 115) connects this event with darśana.) (Note: Malalasekera hypothesized that Kāśyapa probably was his gotra name.) As he ordained him, the Buddha gave three directives to practice: Kāśyapa should develop a "lively sense of fear and regard" towards his fellow monastics, regardless of their status; Kāśyapa should attentively listen and practice the teachings of the Buddha (Sanskrit: Dharma; Pali: Dhamma); and he should live in mindfulness.

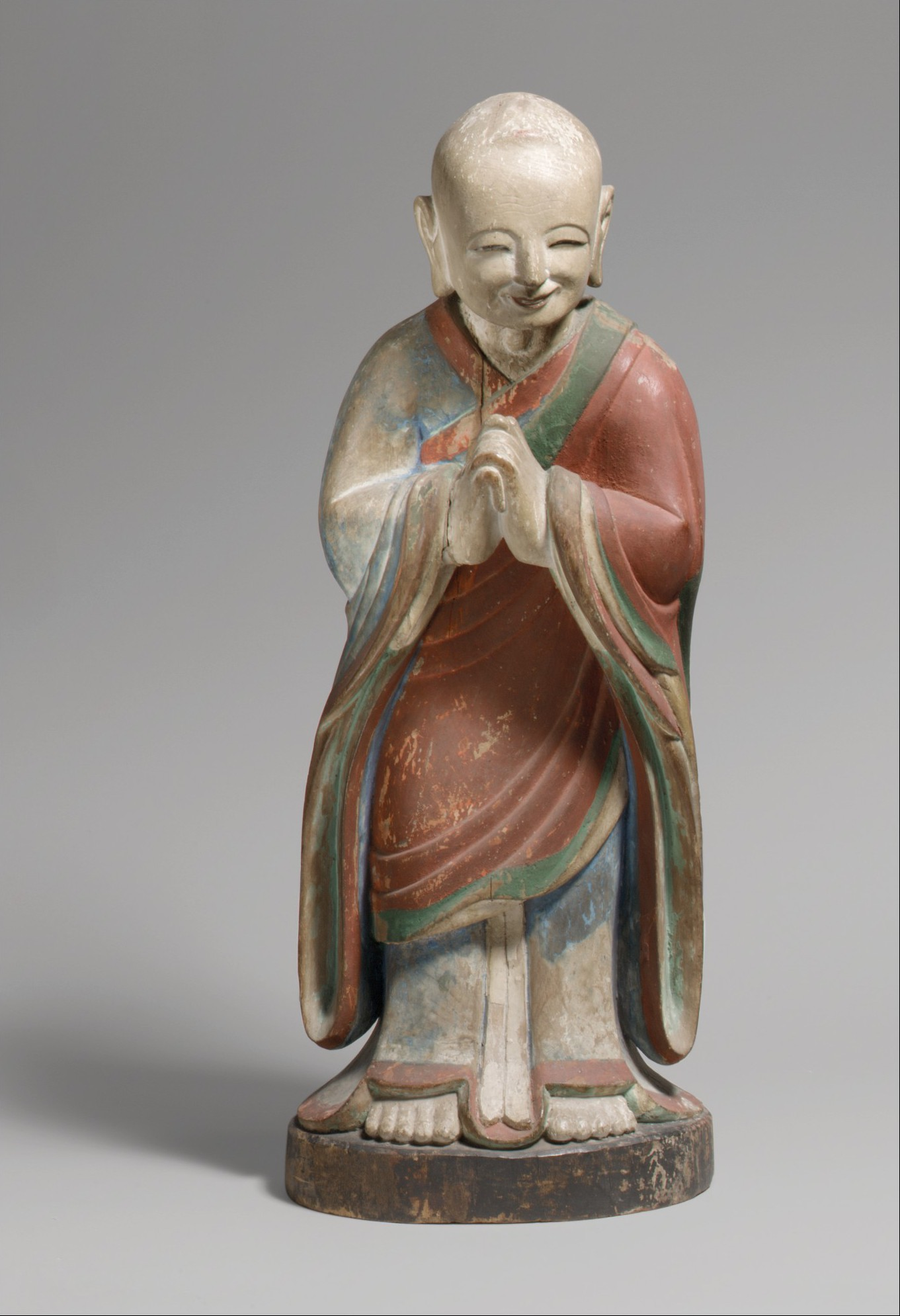
A young Mahākāśyapa, wood, eighteenth century, Korea

When the two met, (or in some versions, some time later) Mahākāśyapa exchanged his fine and expensive robe with that of the Buddha, a robe made of rags. The exchange came to be seen as a gesture of great respect the Buddha had made. It was unprecedented, and a sign that Mahākāśyapa would preside over the First Council after the Buddha's demise. (Note: For the sign, see Buswell & Lopez (2013, Mahākāśyapa). For the exchange being unprecedented, see Karaluvinna (2002, p. 436).) Texts from different traditions suggest that only a person with the great merit as Mahākāśyapa would be able to wear the robe. The only reason the robe was highly valuable was that it had been worn by the Buddha. In itself it was not valuable, because it came from the lowest source, that is, a female slave's corpse discarded in a charnel ground. This also echoed an earlier exchange that took place after the Buddha's Great Renunciation, when he swapped his lay robes with a hunter in the forest. Finally, the fact that it was a rag-robe contributed to the ascetic identity of the figure of Mahākaśyapa.

Throughout cultures, "inalienable possessions", often textiles, were symbols of authority and continuity in a family. Gautama Buddha giving his robe to Mahākāśyapa in the latter's early monastic years demonstrated a deep sense of respect for this disciple. Mahākāśyapa was seen to safeguard this robe to pass on to the future Buddha. Thus, the robe came to represent a passing on of the transmission of Buddhist teachings, and Mahākāśyapa became a symbol of the continuity of the Buddha's dispensation. (Note: See Sanvido (2017, p. 343). For the symbol of continuity, see Adamek (2011, Bodhidharma's Robe) and Analayo (2015, p. 21).) In this context, the rag-robe was also associated in several Asian cultures with gestation, birth, rebirth, impermanence and death.

=== Monastic life ===
The Buddha exhorted Mahākāśyapa that he should practice himself "for the welfare and happiness of the multitude" and impressed upon him that he should take upon himself ascetic practices (Sanskrit: dhūtaguṇa, Pali: dhutaṅga). Accordingly, Mahākāśyapa took upon him the thirteen ascetic practices (including living in the wilderness, living only from alms and wearing rag-robes) and became an enlightened disciple (arahat) in nine days. He was then called 'Kāśyapa the Great' (Sanskrit: Mahākāśyapa), because of his good qualities, and to distinguish him from other monks with the same name. (Note: See Clarke (2014, p. 112) and Karaluvinna (2002, p. 435). Only Karaluvinna explains the reason.) (Note: Buddhist studies scholar Jonathan Silk raises the question whether this epithet may have only become current later, and was not yet used by the Buddha himself.)

Mahākāśyapa was one of the most revered of the Buddha's disciples, the renunciant par excellence. He was praised by the Buddha as foremost in ascetic practices (Pali: dhutavādānaṃ) and a foremost forest dweller. (Note: For the Pāli term, see Malalasekera (1937, vol. 2, Mahākassapa). For being a forest dweller, see Kim (2011, p. 131).) He excelled in supernatural accomplishments (Pali: iddhi; Sanskrit: ṛddhi) and was equal to the Buddha in meditative absorption (Pali: jhāna; Sanskrit: dhyāna). (Note: Buswell & Lopez (2013, Mahākāśyapa) says he was second to the Buddha in this, whereas Karaluvinna (2002, p. 438) and Ray (1994, p. 113) state he was equal to the Buddha.) He is depicted as a monk with great capacity to tolerate discomfort and contentment with the bare necessities of life. In one discourse found in the Pāli and Chinese collections, the Buddha advised Mahākāśyapa that having grown old, he should give up ascetic practices and live close to the Buddha. Mahākāśyapa declined, however. When the Buddha asked him to explain, Mahākāśyapa said he found the practices of benefit to himself. He also argued he could be an example for incoming generations of practitioners. The Buddha agreed with him, and affirmed the benefits of ascetic practices, which he had himself praised for a long time. A second discourse found in the Pāli and two Chinese collections has Mahākāśyapa meet the Buddha as he was wearing simple rag-robes and, according to the Chinese versions, his hair and beard long. Other monks criticized Mahākāśyapa for not looking appropriate when meeting his master. The Buddha responded by praising Mahākāśyapa, however. In the Chinese versions, the Buddha even went so far as to allow Mahākāśyapa to share his seat, but Mahākāśyapa politely declined. When Mahākāśyapa fell ill once, the Buddha went to visit him and reminded him of his efforts in practicing the Buddhist teaching.

=== Relation with Ānanda ===
Two companion statues, eighth century, China

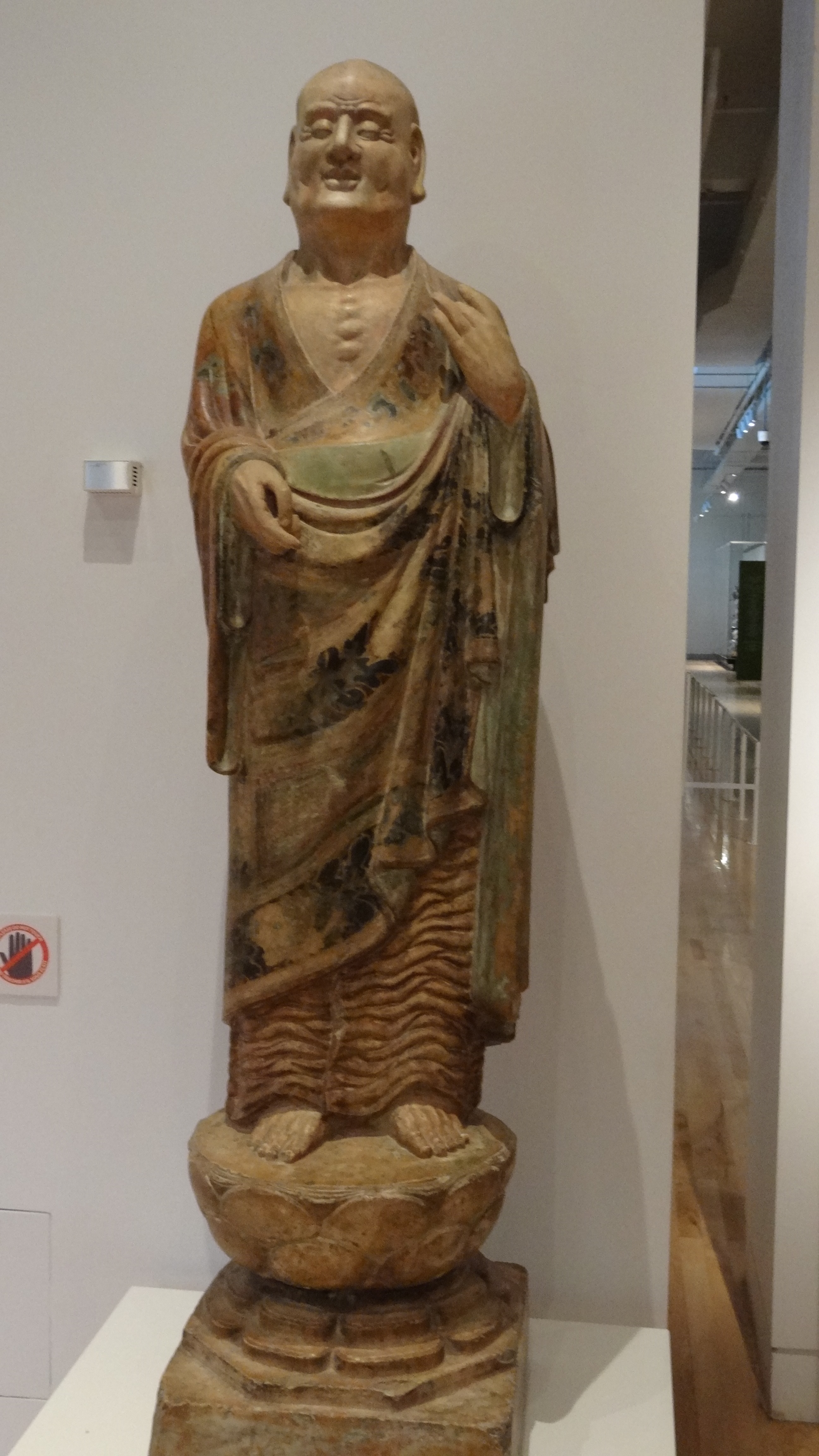
Mahākāśyapa

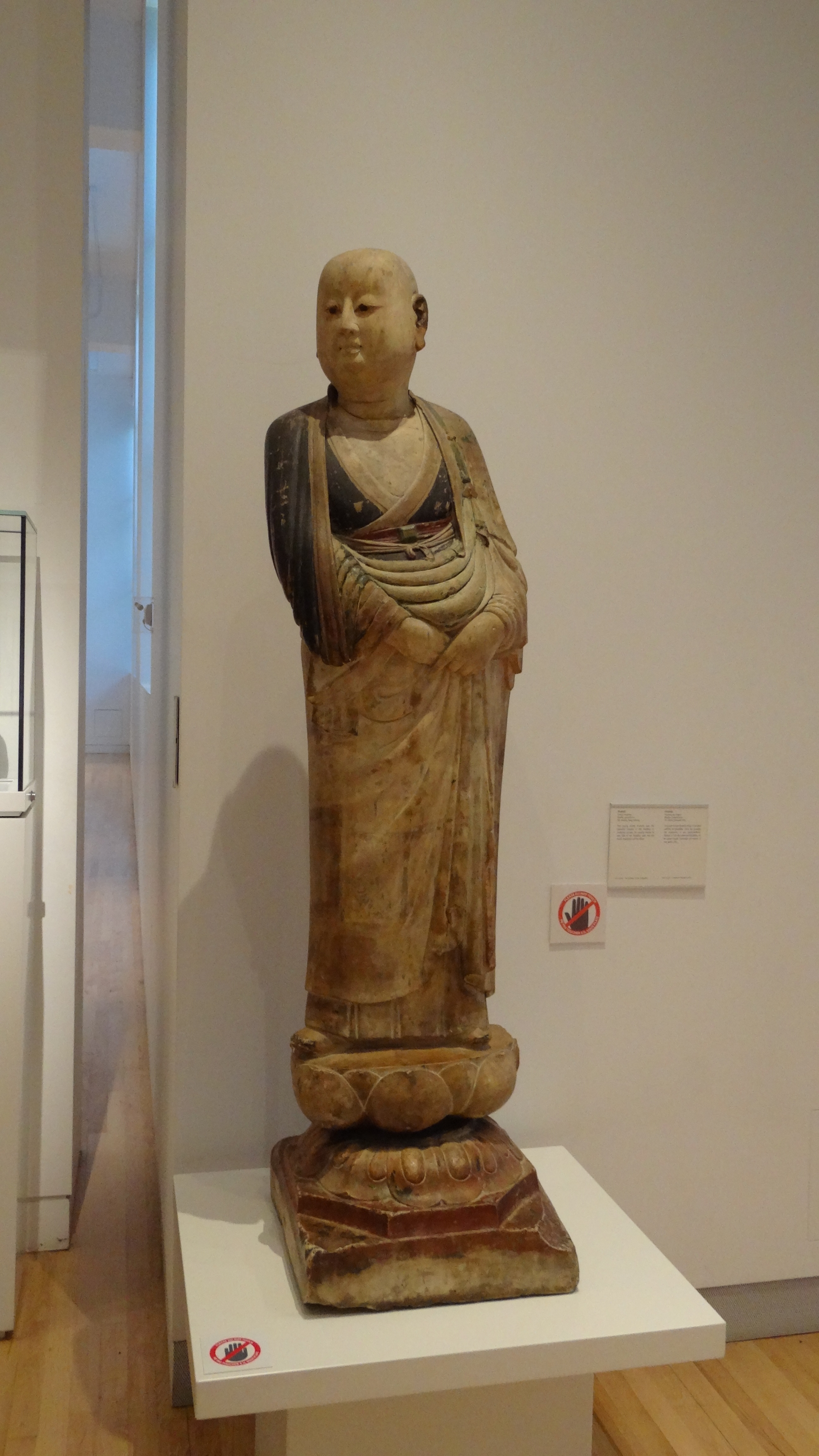
Ānanda

Mahākāśyapa and Ānanda were fellow disciples of the Buddha. Ānanda was the Buddha's close attendant. Mahākāśyapa is often depicted in the early texts as acting critically toward Ānanda. For example, one time Mahākāśyapa chastised Ānanda in strong words, criticizing the fact that Ānanda was travelling with a large following of young monks who appeared untrained and who had built up a bad reputation. According to the early texts, Ānanda's role in founding the bhikṣunī (nun) order made him popular with the bhikṣunīs. Ānanda often taught them, often encouraged women to ordain, and when he was criticized by Mahākāśyapa, several bhikṣunīs tried to defend him. Another time, shortly after the death of the Buddha, Mahākāśyapa gave a teaching to bhikṣunīs in the presence of Ānanda, to which one bhikṣunī, called Sthūlanandā (Pali: Thullanandā), (Note: In the Pāli texts, this is another bhikṣunī, called Thullatissā, not Thullanandā.) responded by criticizing Mahākāśyapa. She felt it inappropriate that Mahākāśyapa should teach in Ānanda's presence, whom she thought of as the superior monk. Mahākāśyapa asked whether Ānanda agreed with her, but he dismissed her as a foolish woman. (Note: See Mun-keat (2017, pp. 303–304) and Ohnuma (2013, pp. 48–49). For the time period, see Karaluvinna (2002, p. 438).) Then Mahākāśyapa proceeded to have Ānanda admit that the Buddha publicly had acknowledged Mahākāśyapa for numerous attainments. Sri Lankan scholar Karaluvinna hypothesizes that Mahākāśyapa did this to dispel doubts about his role as leader of the saṃgha (Pali: saṅgha; monastic community). In a similar event, Mahākāśyapa reprimanded Ānanda for not taking responsibility for his pupils. In this case, Sthūlanandā heavily criticized Mahākāśyapa for doing so, and accused him in a hateful rush for having been an adherent of a non-Buddhist religious sect. In some accounts, she even undressed herself in front of him to insult him. He tried to convince her that he was a legitimate disciple of the Buddha but to no avail. Shortly after, she left the nun's life.

According to Indologist Oskar von Hinüber, Ānanda's pro-bhikṣunī attitude may well be the reason why there was frequent dispute between Ānanda and Mahākāśyapa. This disputes eventually led Mahākāśyapa to charge Ānanda with several offenses during the First Buddhist Council, and possibly caused two factions in the saṃgha to emerge, connected with these two disciples.

In general, Mahākāśyapa was known for his aloofness and love of solitude. But as a teacher, he was a stern mentor who held himself and his fellow renunciates against high standards. He was considered worthy of reverence, but also a sharp critic who impressed upon others that respect to him was due. Compared to Ānanda, he was much colder and stricter, but also more impartial and detached, and religion scholar Reiko Ohnuma argues that these broad differences in character explain the events between Mahākāśyapa and Ānanda better than the more specific idea of pro- and anti-bhikṣunī stances. (Note: Silk follows Buddhist studies scholar Gregory Schopen in noting an important difference between the two disciples with regard to the Buddha's robes. Whereas Mahākāśyapa exchanged his robes with that of the Buddha, Ānanda requested when he became the Buddha's attendant that the Buddha should never give him a robe, lest he should be accused of attending to him for personal gain. Moreover, during the First Council, Ānanda was accused of an offense for having stepped on the Buddha's robe.) Pāli scholar Rune Johansson (1918–1981) argued that the events surrounding Mahākāśyapa, Ānanda and the bhikṣunīs prove that in Buddhism, enlightened disciples can still be seen to make mistakes. Going against this, however, Bhikkhu Anālayo has documented the late nature of episodes portraying Mahākāśyapa turning on Ānanda.

=== Teacher and mentor ===
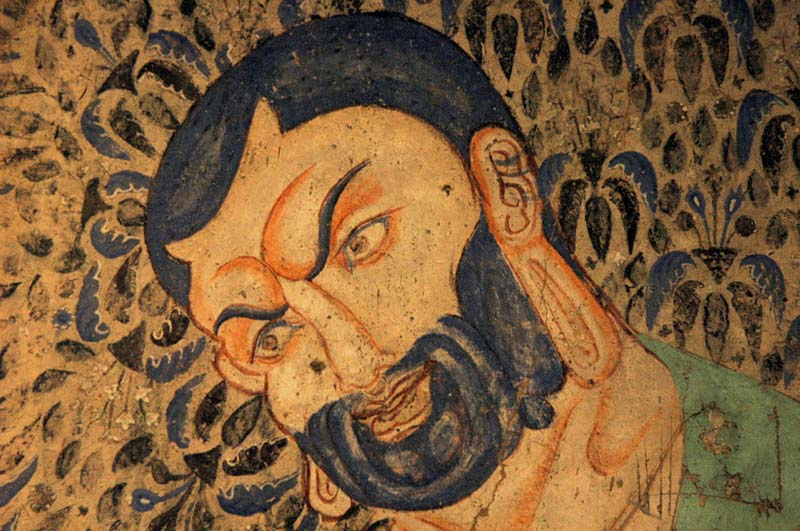
Mahakasyapa in the Kizil Caves, carbon dated to 422–529 CE

Pāli texts state that the Buddha regarded Mahākāśyapa as his equal in exhorting monks to lead active and zealous lives, and the Buddha praised him for his capacity to instill faith in lay people by teaching. Karaluvinna believes that the Buddha may have been grooming Mahākāśyapa for his later role as leader of the saṃgha. In the Saṃyutta discourses featuring Mahākāśyapa in the Pāli and its Chinese parallels, Mahākāśyapa is raised as an example of teaching doctrine from a pure and compassionate intention. Religion scholar Shayne Clarke argues that the aloof and austere ascetic as he is presented in most texts does not provide a complete picture. Anālayo notes that he did take an active concern in community matters, spent time teaching doctrine and persuaded fellow monastics to practice asceticism. This is also shown in his role as leader of the First Council. The Sanskrit Mahākarmavibhaṅga states that Mahākāśyapa carried out important teaching work, and was able to bring Buddhism to the people in the northwest, starting with Avanti.

However, because of his stern tone of teaching and his being selective in people to teach, his teaching style came under criticism by other monks and bhikṣunīs: he was not popular, especially among bhikṣunīs. This caused him to gradually withdraw from teaching, Anālayo argues. Such an ideal of an enlightened disciple with ascetic values, as depicted in Mahākāśyapa and in a more extreme form in the disciple Bakkula, could reflect sentiments and inclinations among some groups of early Buddhists.

Clarke argues that the image of Mahākāśyapa as a detached ascetic was the way he was "branded" by the early Buddhists to the public in general. Studying Mūlasarvāstivāda texts of monastic discipline, Clarke points out that there is also an "in-house" perspective on Mahākāśyapa, which shows that he interacted with his former wife turned bhikṣunī frequently to mentor her. Shortly after Mahākāśyapa became ordained under the Buddha, he met his former wife Bhadra, who had joined an order of naked ascetics led by Nirgrantha Pūraṇa (Pali: Pūraṇa Kassapa). She was regularly targeted for rape by her fellow ascetics, however. Mahākāśyapa pitied her and persuaded her to become ordained as a Buddhist bhikṣunī instead. (Note: However, in some accounts she is only ordained five years after having met the Buddha, after the bhikṣunī order was founded.) Nevertheless, she was still harassed often, but now only when going outside. Since this happened when Bhadra went out in villages to obtain alms, Mahākāśyapa requested the Buddha's permission to daily give half of the alms food he had gained to her, so she did not need to go out anymore. His actions came under criticism, however, from a group of monks called the Group of Six, as well as Sthūlanandā. Although these monastics were known for their misbehavior, Clarke thinks their criticism was probably indicative of "the general monastic ambivalence toward those of an ascetic bent". (Note: Clarke (2014, pp. 107, 112–113). Quote is on page 113.) Writing about Sthūlanandā, Ohnuma says that Sthūlanandā went against the idea of detachment and renunciation as generally advocated in early Buddhist monasticism, which is why she hated Mahākāśyapa and Bhadra. She expressed criticism of Mahākāśyapa often, even when he did not act with typical ascetic detachment. Regardless, Mahākāśyapa continued to guide his former wife and she attained arhat (Pali: arahant) afterwards. In a poem attributed to her, she praises her ex-husband's gifts, shared vision of the truth and spiritual friendship. Mahākāśyapa did not mention her in his poems, though.

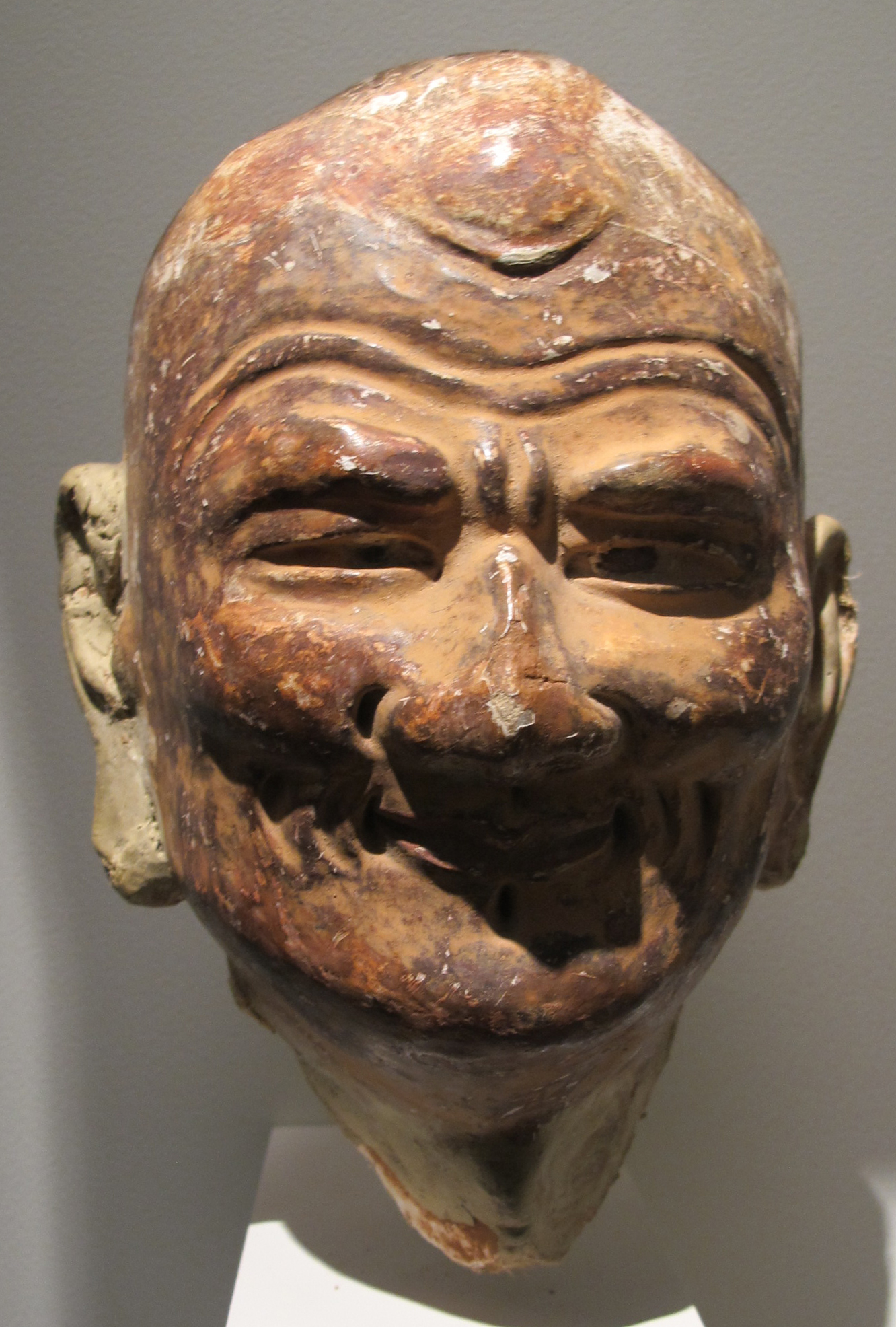
Mahākāśyapa. Seventh-eighth century, Mogao Caves, China.

Mahākāśyapa was sometimes consulted by other leading monks on points of doctrine. After some teachers from non-Buddhist sects asked the elder Śāriputra about the unanswered questions, he consulted with Mahākāśyapa as to why the Buddha had never given an answer to these questions. At another occasion, Śāriputra consulted him about developing efforts in the practice of Buddhist teachings. Mahākāśyapa was also Śroṇa-Koṭikarṇa's (Pali: Soṇa-Koṭikaṇṇa) teacher and friend of the family, and later his upādhyāya (Pali: upajjhāya). (Note: An upādhyāya is a preceptor in Buddhist ordinations.) He taught the Aṭṭhakavagga to him, and later Śroṇa became well known for the recitation of it.

Another aspect of Mahākāśyapa's role as teacher was his compassion for the poor. Numerous accounts describe how he went out of his way to give impoverished donors the chance to give to him and support him in his livelihood. Such donors would typically provide him with secondhand food, which in the culture of Brahminism at the time was considered impure. By receiving food from these donors, Mahākāśyapa was considered a field of merit for them, or, in other words, an opportunity for them to make merit and "vanquish their bad karma". In one case, he sought out a very poor woman who was at the end of her life, just to give her an opportunity to give a little. At first she did not dare to because she felt the food's quality was too low, but when Mahākāśyapa kept waiting, she eventually realized he had just come for her, and gave. Religion scholar Liz Wilson argues that these accounts of generosity have been influenced by pre-Buddhist beliefs of Vedic sacrifice, in which the sacrificer and the sacrificed are connected, and the offering contains something of the person offering. By giving something of themselves, the donors acquire a new self, and purify themselves by means of the monastic recipient. In one account, a leprose person accidentally lets her finger fall off in a bowl of food she is offering. Mahākāśyapa accepts and consumes the offering anyway. Further, Mahākāśyapa's choice for poor people to make merit is further amplified by having supernatural or extraordinary donors like deities or a wealthy merchant compete with the poor, and Mahākāśyapa accepting only the poor as donor. In one discourse, he even advises other monastics against visiting "high-born families". The poor donors making an offering to Mahākāśyapa thus become empowered with a high status and power through their merit-making. Wilson surmises, "[t]he perfect donor, in Mahakassapa's eyes, is the donor who has the least to give...". (Note: Wilson (2003, pp. 58, 63, 68). Quote is on page 63.)

Mahākāśyapa's insistence on accepting offerings from the poor and refusing those from high-standing or supernatural donors was part of the anti-establishment character with which Mahākāśyapa is depicted. This also includes his long hair and beard. In one text, Mahākāśyapa's refusal of high-profile donors led to the Buddha issuing a rule that donations must not be refused.

=== Final respects to the Buddha ===
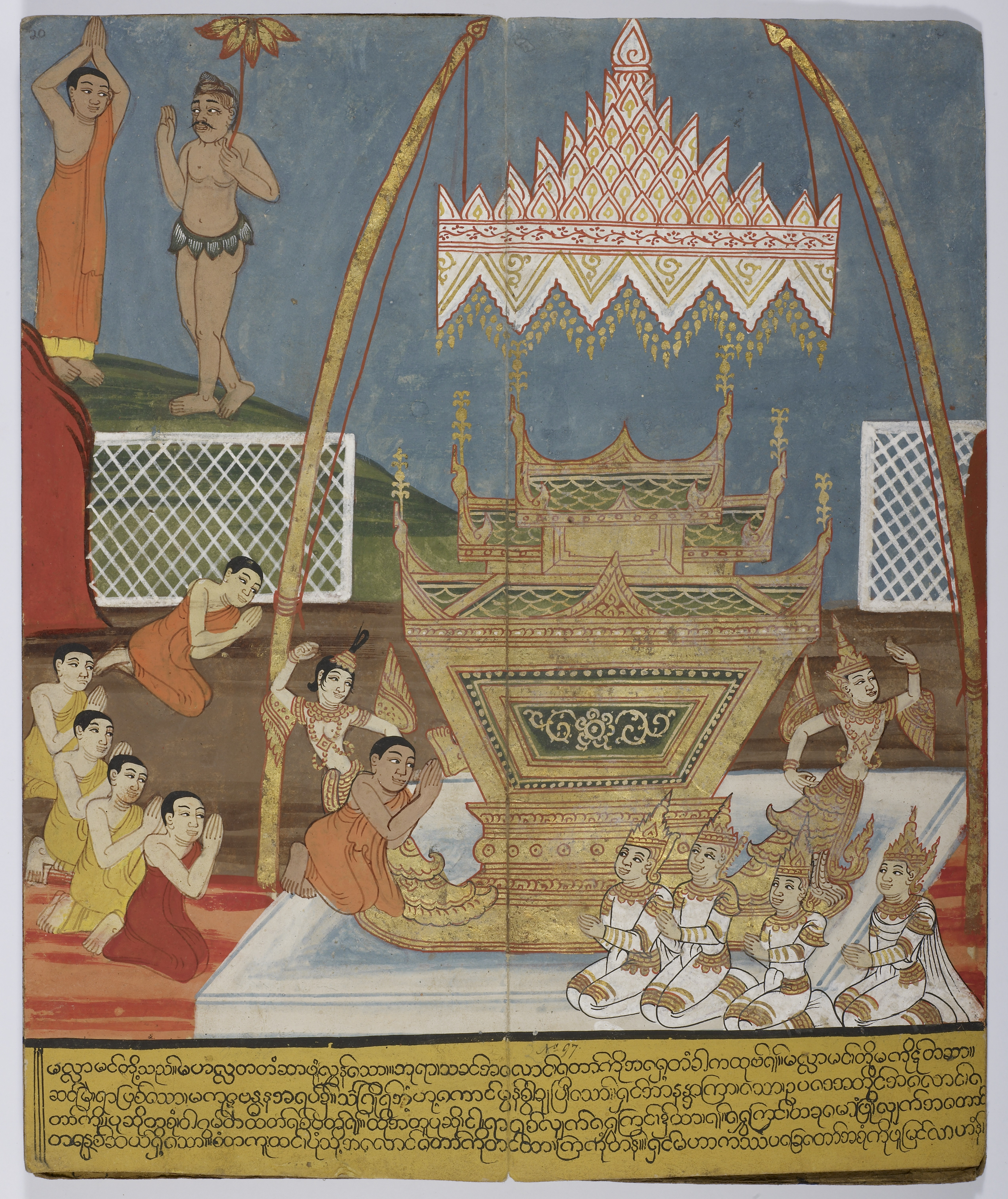
Burma, mid 19th century. Mahākassapa meeting the ājīvika ascetic (above) and paying homage to the Buddha's feet before the funeral pyre is lit (below).

According to the early Pāli discourse about the Buddha's last days and passing into Nirvāṇa (Pali: Mahāparinibbāna Sutta), Mahākāśyapa learnt about the Buddha's parinirvāṇa (Pali: parnibbāna; death and attainment of final Nirvāṇa) after seven days. He was resting from a journey with a following of monks when he met an ājīvika ascetic who was carrying a flower from a coral tree which originated from heaven. He asked him about the flower, and it turned out that the entire area of Kuśinagara (Pali: Kusinara), where the Buddha had died, was covered in it. (Note: See Gethin (2008, p. 135); Harvey (2013, p. 222) and Karaluvinna (2002, p. 437). Karaluvinna mentions the name of the flower and its origin. Franke (1908, p. 10 footnote) mentions that it covered Kuśinagara.) According to some Tibetan sources, however, Mahākāśyapa knew of the Buddha's death because of an earthquake. In the Pāli texts, Mahākāśyapa then rushed back from the Pāva Mountain to arrive in Kuśinagara seven days later. But in the Tibetan texts, Mahākāśyapa was concerned that King Ajātaśatru might die of shock when he heard of the Buddha's death. He therefore warned a brahmin who worked at the court, who was able to prevent the king from dying. Only then did he proceed to Kuśinagara.

It turned out the Malla people from Kuśinagara had attempted to light the funeral pyre of the Buddha but were unable to. Pāli accounts state that the monk Anuruddha explained to them that deities prevented the funeral pyre from being lit until the arrival of Mahākāśyapa, although sixth-century Chinese Buddhist texts say it was the spiritual power of the Buddha instead which caused the delay. The accounts continue that Mahākāśyapa paid "deep and tender homage" at the Buddha's feet. The Buddha's feet miraculously emerged from the coffin, in which the Buddha's body was enshrouded with many layers of cloth. As soon as he had finished, the pyre lit spontaneously, although in some versions, Mahākāśyapa lit the pyre himself in the traditional Indian role of the eldest son. (Note: For the Chinese accounts, see Lee (2010, pp. 57–58, 91). For the Pāli accounts, see Karaluvinna (2002, p. 437). For the eldest son, see Strong (2007, p. 115). For the quote, see Ray (1994, p. 107). Also see Strong (2001, p. 138).)

Buddhologist André Bareau (1921–1993) regarded the episode of Mahākāśyapa learning of the Buddha's parinirvāṇa and his lighting of the pyre as an embellishment that was inserted by authors of monastic discipline over the fifth, fourth and third centuries BCE, to emphasize the person of Mahākāśyapa. Bareau reasoned that Mahākāśyapa did not attend the Buddha's cremation in the original version, and that Mahākāśyapa could have taken a route of just a few hours via Pāva to Kuśinagara. Regardless, the story of the delay and of Mahākāśyapa eventually lighting the funeral pyre indicates how much Mahākāśyapa was respected, as he was regarded as the most important heir to the Buddha's dispensation.

=== First Buddhist Council ===
==== Narratives ====
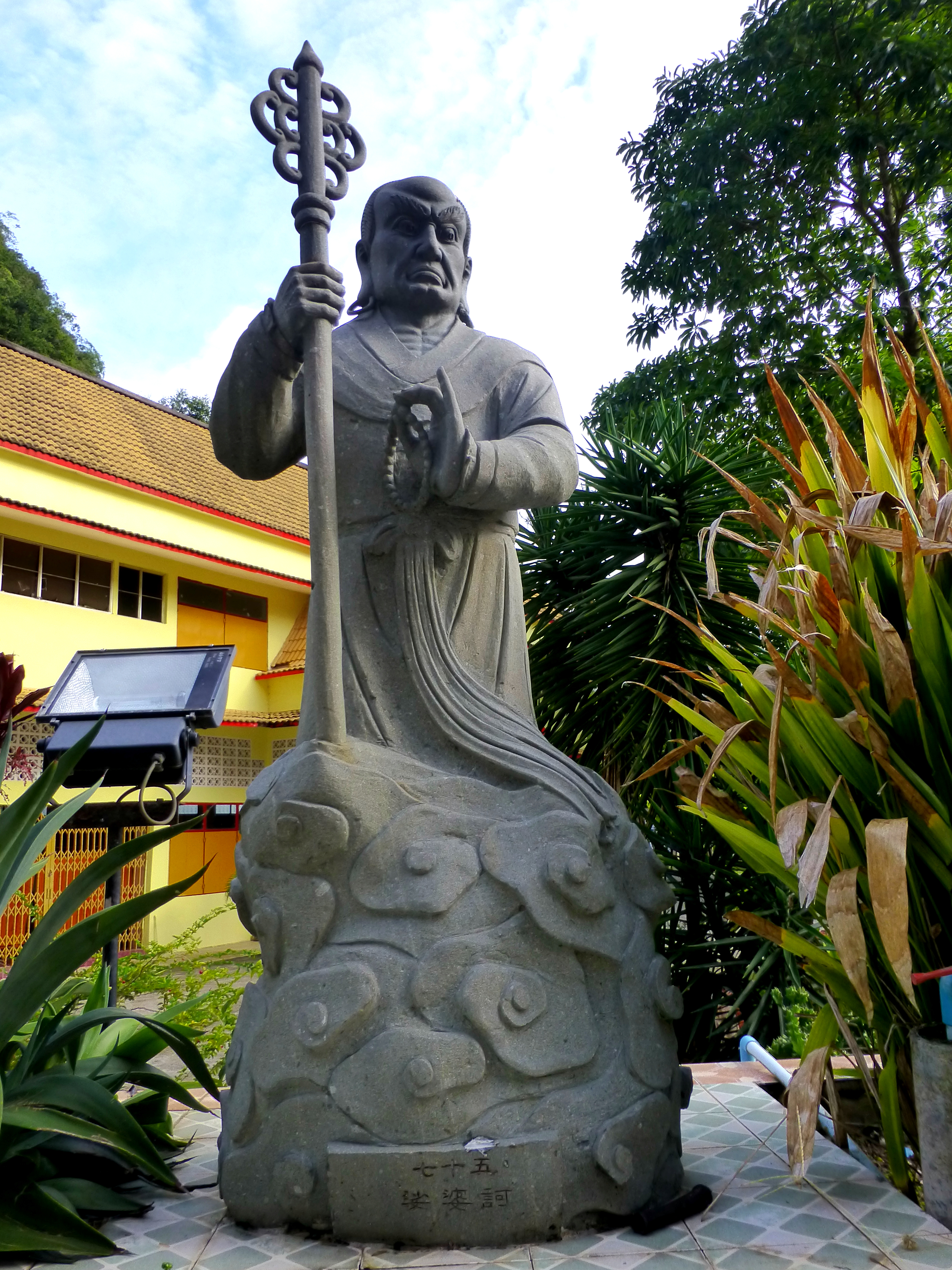
Mahākāśyapa, Tham Khao Rup Chang Temple, Songkhla Province, Thailand

When the Buddha had attained parinirvāṇa (death), and when Mahākāśyapa was reportedly 120 years old, the number of disciples that had once met the Buddha or had attained enlightenment was shrinking. (Note: For the number of people seeing the Buddha decreasing, see Powers (2016, p. 19). For the enlightened decreasing, and the age of Mahākāśyapa, see Karaluvinna (2002, p. 440).) Some monks, among them a monk called Subhadra (Pali: Subhadda), expressed satisfaction that they could now do as they pleased, because their teacher the Buddha was no longer there to prohibit them from anything. Some Chinese and Tibetan texts state that there was "doubt and consternation" among many disciples. The Sanskrit Aśokavadāna and the Chinese Mahāprajñāpāramitāśāstra say that many enlightened disciples wished to stop teaching, leave the world behind and attain paranirvāṇa. This alarmed Mahākāśyapa, and he successfully attempted to stop his fellow disciples from leaving the world. To record the Buddha's discourses and preserve monastic discipline, Mahākāśyapa set up the First Buddhist Council. According to the texts, the First Buddhist Council was held in a cave called Saptaparṇaguhā in Rājagṛha (Pali: Sattapaṇṇaguhā; Rājagaha, present-day Rajgir), which was the site of many Buddhist discourses. (Note: For the city, see Powers (2016, p. 19). For the cave, see Deeg (1999, pp. 160–161).) In the first rains retreat (Sanskrit: varṣa, Pali: vassa) after the Buddha had died, Mahākāśyapa called upon Ānanda to recite the discourses he had heard, as a representative on this council. (Note: Ānanda was known for his ability to remember the many teachings of the Buddha, and was described as foremost in "having heard much".) There was a rule issued, however, that only arhats were allowed to attend the council, to prevent bias like favoritism or sectarianism from clouding the disciples' memories. Ānanda had not attained enlightenment yet. Mahākāśyapa therefore did not yet allow Ānanda to attend. Although he knew that Ānanda's presence in the council was required, he did not want to be biased by allowing an exception to the rule. The Mūlasarvāstivāda tradition adds that Mahākāśyapa initially allowed Ānanda to join as a sort of servant assisting during the council, but then was forced to remove him when the disciple Anuruddha saw that Ānanda was not yet enlightened.

Nevertheless, that night, Ānanda was able to attain enlightenment. When the Council began the next morning, Mahākāśyapa questioned Upāli, to establish the texts on monastic discipline for monks and bhikṣuṇis. Ānanda was consulted to recite the discourses and to determine which were authentic and which were not. Mahākāśyapa asked of each discourse that Ānanda listed where, when, and to whom it was given. Then the assembly agreed that Ānanda's memories and recitations were correct, after which the discourse collection (Sanskrit: Sūtra Piṭaka, Pali: Sutta Piṭaka) was considered finalized and closed. In some versions of the account, the Abhidharma (Pali: Abhidhamma) was also standardized during this council, or rather its precursor the Mātṛka. Some texts say it was Mahākāśyapa who reviewed it, and other texts say it was Ānanda or Śāriputra. (Note: For Ānanda, see Buswell & Lopez (2013, Council, 1st). For Śāriputra, see Migot (1954, p. 525). For the Mātṛka, see Migot and Morrison (2010, p. 21).) During the recitations, one problem was raised. Before the Buddha's parinirvāṇa, he had mentioned to Ānanda that, if required, minor rules could be abolished after his death. Now the question remained what the Buddha had meant when he said minor rules. The monks present at the council discussed several possibilities, but it was not resolved. To prevent disrepute of the saṃgha and criticism from non-Buddhists, Mahākāśyapa opposed to abolish any rules of discipline. (Note: Prebish (2005, p. 226). For the non-Buddhists, see Tsukamoto (1963, p. 57).) After the council, Mahákáyapa attempted to have the monks Gavāmpati and Purāṇa approve the results of the council, but both preferred not to give their opinion about the matter.

During the same council, Ānanda was charged for an offense by Mahākāśyapa and other members of the saṅgha for having enabled women to join the monastic order. Besides this, he was charged for having forgotten to request the Buddha to specify which offenses of monastic discipline could be disregarded; for having stepped on the Buddha's robe; for having allowed women to honor the Buddha's body after his death, which was not properly covered, and during which his body was sullied by their tears; and for having failed to ask the Buddha to continue to live on. Ānanda did not acknowledge these as offenses, but he conceded to do a formal confession anyway, "... in faith of the opinion of the venerable elder monks".

==== Historicity ====
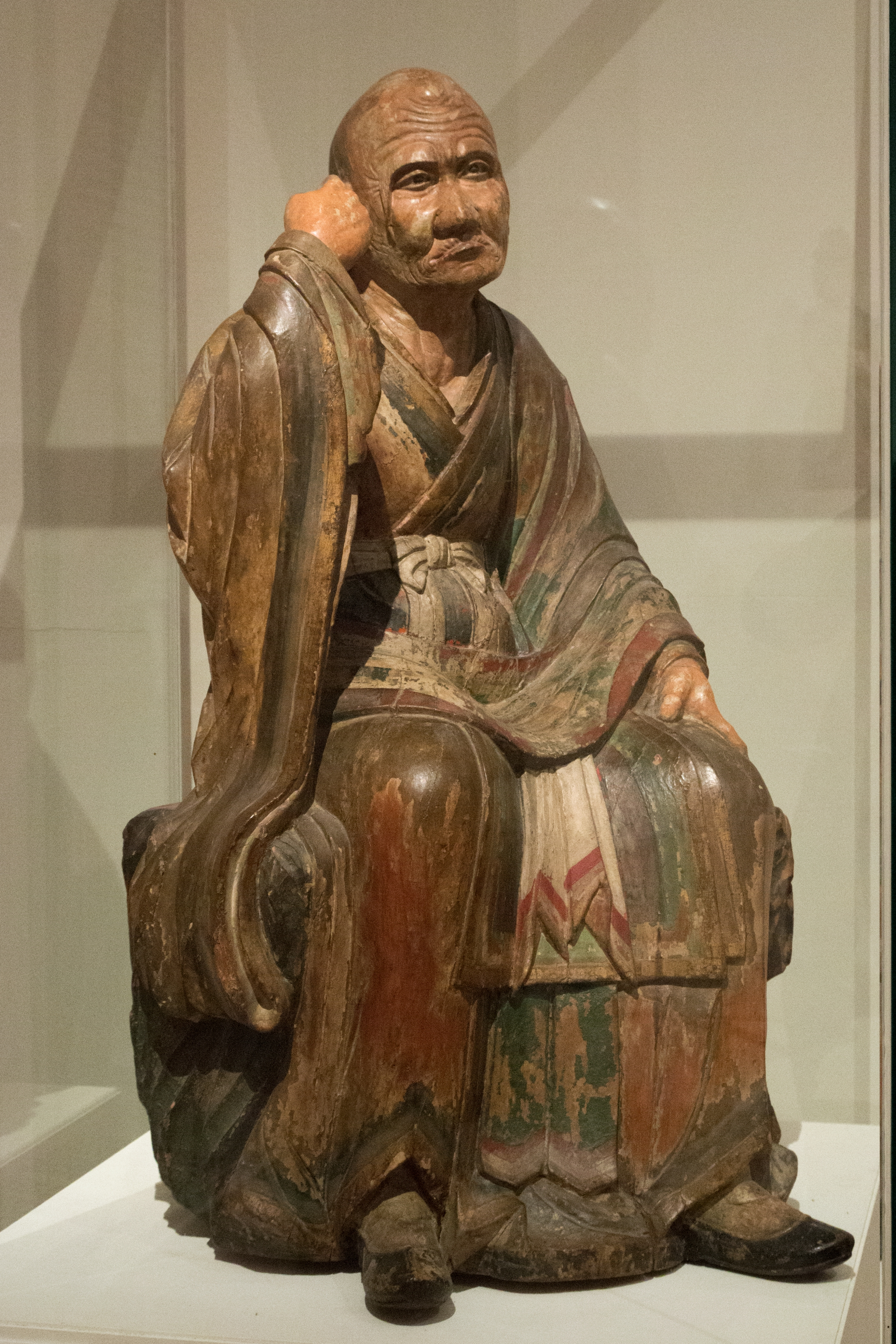
Mahākāśyapa sitting, holding a staff (missing). Wood, China, c. 1000.

The most well-known version of the First Council is that of Mahākāśyapa being the head. However, texts of the Sarvāstivāda, Mūlasarvāstivāda, and Mahīśāsaka traditions relate that this was Ājñāta Kauṇḍinya (Pali: Añña-Koṇḍañña) instead, as Kauṇḍinya was the most senior disciple. Buddhologist Jean Przyluski (1885–1944) argued that the earliest accounts placed Kauṇḍinya at the head of the saṃgha, and that originally, Mahākāśyapa was a conventional figure, with no administrative or leading role. However, because of his unquestioned ascetic saint-like reputation, Mahākāśyapa came to replace Kauṇḍinya's role as leader during the cremation and the First Council. Przyluski's theory has been criticized, however, on the grounds that it is difficult to maintain that the three textual traditions he mentioned are the oldest. Still, Bareau argued that the incident with Subhadra leading to Mahākāśyapa summoning the council is a later insertion, though early enough to be found in all traditions of early Buddhist texts. He believed it was the authors of texts of monastic discipline that inserted it shortly after the Buddha's death, at the end of the fifth century BCE, to glorify Mahākāśyapa.

Tradition states that the First Council lasted for seven months. However, many scholars, from the late 19th century onward, have considered the historicity of the First Council improbable. Some scholars, such as Orientalist Ivan Minayev (1840–1890), thought there must have been assemblies after the Buddha's death, but considered only the main characters and some events before or after the First Council historical, and not the council itself. Other scholars, such as Bareau and Indologist Hermann Oldenberg (1854–1920), considered it likely that the account of the First Council was written after the Second Council, and based on that of the Second, since there were not any major problems to solve after the Buddha's death, or any other need to organize the First Council. On the other hand, archaeologist Louis Finot (1864–1935) and Indologist E. E. Obermiller (1901–1935) thought the account of the First Council was authentic, because of the correspondences between the Pāli texts and the Sanskrit traditions. Orientalist Louis de La Vallée-Poussin (1869–1938) and Indologist Nalinaksha Dutt (1893–1973) thought it was historical, but in the form of a simple recitation of discipline (Sanskrit: prātimokṣa, Pali: pātimokkha; according to Dutt, in order settle the "minor rules") not a complete council with a full review of the discourses. Indologist Richard Gombrich, following Bhikkhus Sujato and Brahmali's arguments, considers that the Council "makes good sense". They argue that the Council was historical, because all the known versions of monastic discipline relate it. Some of those, such as the Theravāda discipline, do not include the recitation of the Abhidharma in their account, even though it was an important part of their identity—this shows the historical nature of the accounts.

Indologist Erich Frauwallner (1898–1974) noted that in the earliest Buddhist discourses little mention is made of Mahākāśyapa, especially when compared to Ānanda. However, in the accounts about the First Council, Mahākāśyapa appears very prominent, whereas Ānanda is humbled and given far less credit. Frauwallner argued this points at "a deep reaching modification and revaluation of the tradition" concerning the position of these two figures. On a similar note, Buddhist studies scholar Jonathan Silk remarks that the earliest Chinese translations hardly mention Mahākāśyapa. Ray argues there is a difference in this between Pāli texts and texts from other early schools: the Pāli version of Mahākāśyapa is a much more ordinary person, depicted with far less supernatural powers and moral authority than in texts such as those from the Mūlasarvāstivāda discipline and in the Mahāvastu. Although there are some Pāli texts that do emphasize forest renunciation, these are fragmented elements that stand in stark contrast with Mahākāśyapa's general role in the Pāli history of the monastic establishment.

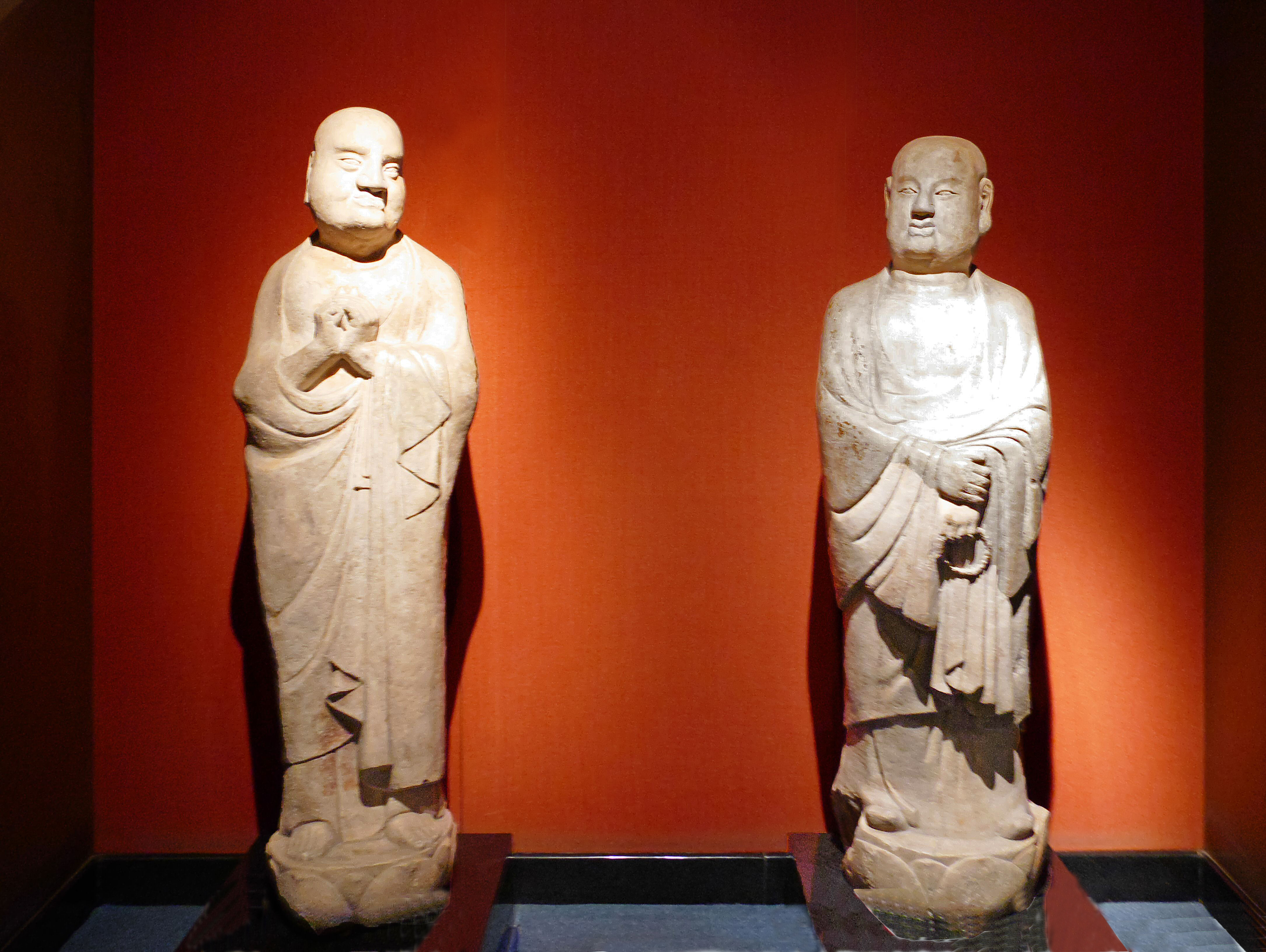
Mahākāśyapa (left) and Ānanda (right), China, Song Dynasty (960–1279)

Von Hinüber, Przyluski and Bareau have argued that the account of Ānanda being charged with offenses during the council indicate tensions between competing Early Buddhist schools, i.e. schools that emphasized the discourses and schools that emphasized monastic discipline. These differences have affected the scriptures of each tradition: (Note: See Findly (1992, pp. 253). For Bareau, see Analayo (2016, p. 172, note 75)) e.g. the Pāli and Mahīśāsaka textual traditions portray a Mahākāśyapa that is more critical of Ānanda than that the Sarvāstivāda tradition depicts him, reflecting a preference for discipline on the part of the former traditions, and a preference for discourse for the latter. Analyzing six recensions of different textual traditions of the Mahāparinibbāna Sutta extensively, Bareau distinguished two layers in the text, an older and a newer one, the former, fifth century BCE, belonging to the compilers that emphasized discourse, the latter, mostly fourth and third century BCE, to the ones that emphasized discipline; the former emphasizing the figure of Ānanda, the latter Mahākāśyapa. Buddhologist André Migot (1892–1967) argued, too, that the oldest texts (fifth century BCE) mostly glorify Ānanda as being the most well-learned (Sanskrit: bahuśruta, Pali: bahussutta); a second series of newer texts (fourth century-early third century BCE) glorify Mahākāśyapa as being eminent in discipline (Sanskrit: śīla, Pali: sīla); and the newest texts (mid third century BCE) glorify Śāriputra as being the wisest (Sanskrit: prajñā, Pali: paññā). Mahākāśyapa was mostly associated with the texts of monastic discipline, during the fourth century until early third century BCE when Buddhism was prominent in Vaiśālī. Bareau, Przyluski and Indologist I. B. Horner (1896–1981) therefore argued that the offenses Ānanda were charged with were a later interpolation. Scholar of religion Ellison Banks Findly disagrees, however, because the account in the texts of monastic discipline fits in with the Mahāparinibbāna Sutta and with Ānanda's character as generally depicted in the texts. Minayev thought the charges were an ancient tradition, because they are not usually the material of legends, because the Chinese pilgrim Xuanzang (602–664) reported a stūpa (Pali: thūpa; a memorial mound or monument) that was erected in memory of the event, and because the ambiguity about what constitutes major and minor rules would have been typical for that period.

Expanding on the theory of the two factions, Przyluski noted that the figure of Ānanda represents Buddhism in an early form, whereas Mahākaśyapa represents a Buddhism that had undergone reform. Ānanda represents a "religion of love", whereas Mahākaśyapa represents "a rough ascetic spirit". Migot interpreted Ānanda's figure as a devotionalist form of Buddhism focused on the guru, replaced by Mahākāśyapa's established monasticism with less focus on devotion.

Although the Buddha did not appoint a formal successor, Mahākāśyapa's leading role and seniority effectively made him the head of the saṃgha during the first twenty years after the Buddha's parinirvāṇa. After the death of the Buddha and his close disciples Śāriputra and Maudgalyāyana, he had become the most influential figure in the Buddhist order. In the Early Buddhist Texts, Mahākāśyapa's death is not discussed. This is discussed in post-canonical texts, however.

== In post-canonical texts ==
=== Patriarch ===
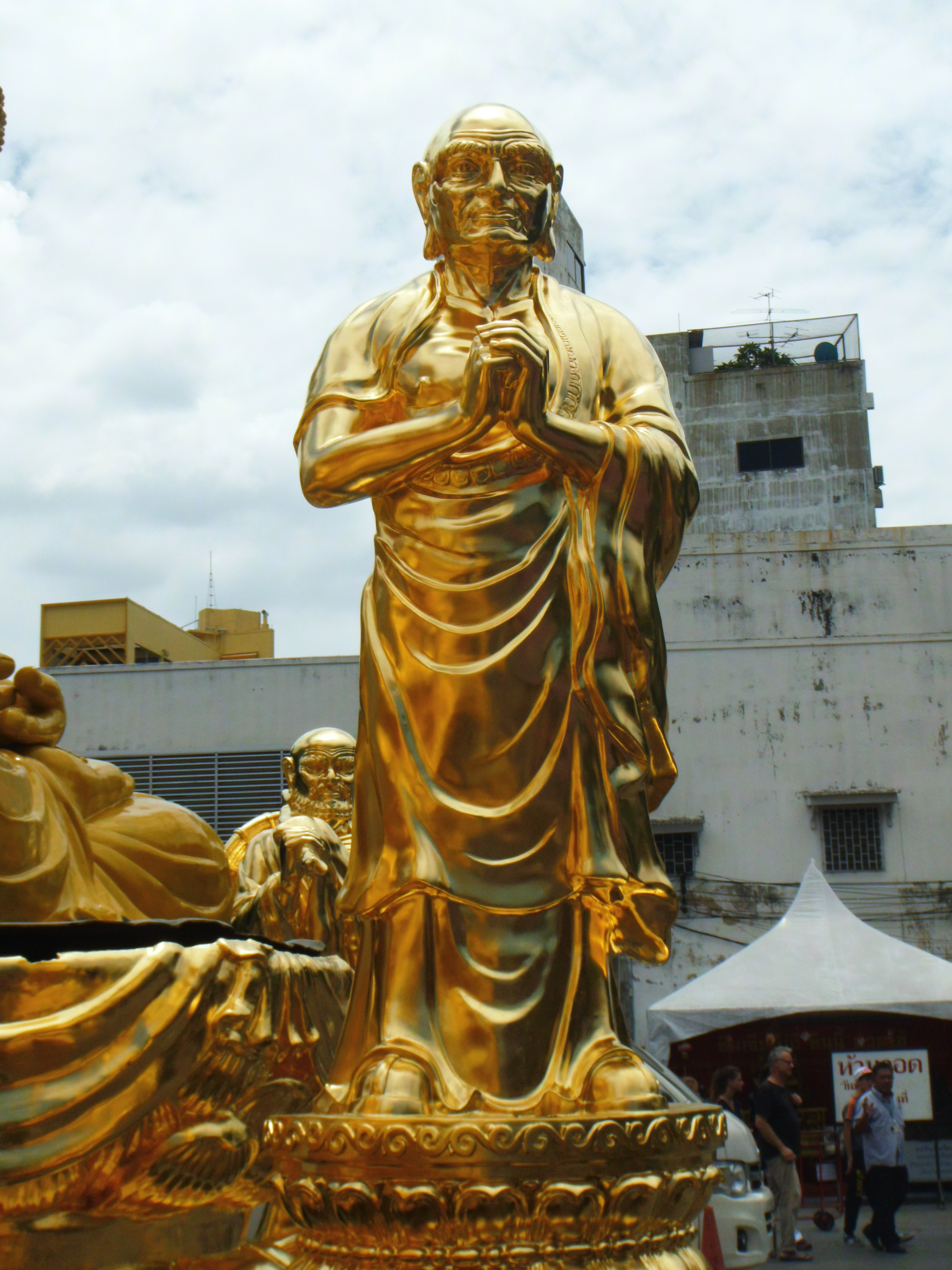
Thai statue of Mahākāśyapa, Wat Traimit

In many Indian Sanskrit and East Asian texts, from as early as the second century CE, Mahākāśyapa is considered the first patriarch of the lineage which transmitted the teaching of the Buddha, with Ānanda being the second. (Note: See Buswell & Lopez (2013, Damoduoluo chan jing; Madhyāntika) and Welter (2004, pp. 462–463). For the second century, see Morrison (2010, p. 20).) One of the earliest motifs of a tradition of patriarchs is that of the Five Masters of the Dharma (Sanskrit: dharmācārya), found in Sanskrit texts from the second century CE, including the Aśokāvadāna and the Mahāyāna Mahāparinirvāṇa Sūtra, and many archaeological findings. This tradition may in itself be based on early Buddhist accounts about the First Council, but further expanded on the idea of the preservation of the teachings. The accounts about the Five Masters seems to derive not so much from a concern about the transmission of the teaching though, but rather a concern regarding the absence of the Buddha himself. The texts gave the Masters of the Dharma each a similar role and charisma as the Buddha, or, as Buddhist studies scholar John S. Strong puts it, "all, in a sense, Buddhas in their own time". This fit in with the concept of inheritance in ancient India, in which a son would not only inherit his father's possessions, but also his position and identity. (Note: For Strong's quote, see Morrison (2010, p. 22). Silk (2003, pp. 180–181) discusses similar tendencies, but with regard to the patriarchs in general, not specifically the Five Masters.) Several early Buddhist schools would expand on the idea of the Five Masters of the Dharma, including the Sarvāstivadins, the Mūlasarvāstivādins and the Sthāviras, (Note: Nevertheless, the idea of transmission of the Dharma (Buddhist doctrine) through a list of patriarchs is not found in Pāli sources.) each of which extended the list to include their own masters as patriarchs.

There is an account dating back from the Sarvāstivāda and Mūlasarvāstivāda textual traditions which states that before Mahākāśyapa died, he bestowed the Buddha's teaching on Ānanda as a formal passing on of authority, telling Ānanda to pass the teaching on to his pupil Śāṇakavāsī (Pali: Saṇavāsī; a.k.a. Śāṇakavāsin or Śāṇāvasika). (Note: See Baruah (2000, pp. 9, 453). For the period being just before Mahākāśyapa's death, see Strong (1994, p. 62) and Karaluvinna (2002, p. 439). For the Mūlasarvāstivāda, see Hirakawa (1993, p. 85).) Mahākāśyapa made a prediction that later would come true that a lay person called Śāṇakavāsī would make many gifts to the saṅgha during a feast. After this event, Ānanda would successfully persuade him to become ordained and be his pupil. Later, just before Ānanda died, he passed the teaching on to his pupil as Mahākāśyapa had told him to. Ray notes that Mahākāśyapa is depicted here as choosing not only his successor, but also the successor of his successor, which emphasizes the preeminent position that Mahākāśyapa was seen to have.

Buddhist studies scholars Akira Hirakawa (1915–2002) and Bibhuti Baruah have expressed skepticism about the teacher–student relationship between Mahākāśyapa and Ānanda. They have argued that there was discord between the two, as indicated in the early texts. Hirakawa has further hypothesized that Mahākāśyapa and Ānanda were co-disciples, with the same teacher being Gautama Buddha, so there would be no need for a transmission between the two. East Asian religion scholar Elizabeth Morrison cites a tract by the Zen scholar Qisong (1007–1072) about the tradition of patriarchs in Buddhism. He noted the problem of a transmission between co-disciples who are not master and student. He resolved the problem by comparing Mahākāśyapa and Ānanda to siblings who inherit according to birth order. Responding to Hirakawa's arguments, Silk further argues that the unilinear nature of the transmission made it impossible for both Mahākāśyapa and Ānanda to receive the transmission from the Buddha, so Ānanda had to receive the transmission from Mahākāśyapa instead.

=== Preserving the Buddha's relics ===
The fifth-century commentary to the Dīgha Nikāya relates that after the Buddha's paranirvāṇa, Mahākāśyapa was concerned that the Buddha's remains or relics would become too dispersed, since they were now divided in eight portions. (Note: For the exact motivation, see Strong (2001, p. 141). For the text, see Lagirarde (2006, p. 84).) He gathered the portions of the Buddha's relics, by requesting them from the families who had preserved them, though he left a token amount of relics with the families. (Note: For the families, see Lagirarde (2006, p. 84). For the token amount, see Strong (2007, p. 121).) With the help of King Ajātaśatru, he then preserved them in an underground chamber called the "shrine for the eighty disciples" to the east of Rājagṛha. (Note: For the chamber, see Bautze-Picron (2010, p. 12). For Rājagṛha, see Lagirarde (2006, p. 84).) Because of the name, Southeast Asia scholar François Lagirarde raises the question whether this chamber may also have been intended for the burial of relics of foremost disciples, but Strong interprets that it was a ruse: the whole operation was done in secrecy because Mahākāśyapa feared for the safety of the Buddha's relics. Later, according to post-canonical Buddhist texts such as the Theravāda Paṭhamasambodhi, the remains thus enshrined in one place were taken out and divided by emperor Aśoka (c.268–232 BCE) throughout India in 84,000 portions. (Note: For the texts, see Swearer (2010, pp. 43, 47). For the number of portions, see Strong (2001, p. 141).) Instead of the relics being hid away somewhere, they were now accessible to the population at large.

The earliest accounts have Mahākāśyapa merely visit and pay his respects to each of the eight portions of the relics; later accounts have him gather the relics as well. There is a parallel here with the First Council, in which Mahākāśyapa gathered the entire body of the Buddha's teachings (Sanskrit: dharmakāya; Pali: dhammakāya) in one place, as he is depicted gathering the Buddha's remains (Sanskrit and Pali: rūpakāya) in one place. Still, there may be a historical basis to the motif of the single place with the Buddha's relics. Przyluski and Bareau have argued on textual and other grounds that the Buddha's relics were originally kept in one single place, in a sepulcher (Przyluski) or a stūpa (Bareau).

=== Awaiting Maitreya ===
==== Accounts ====
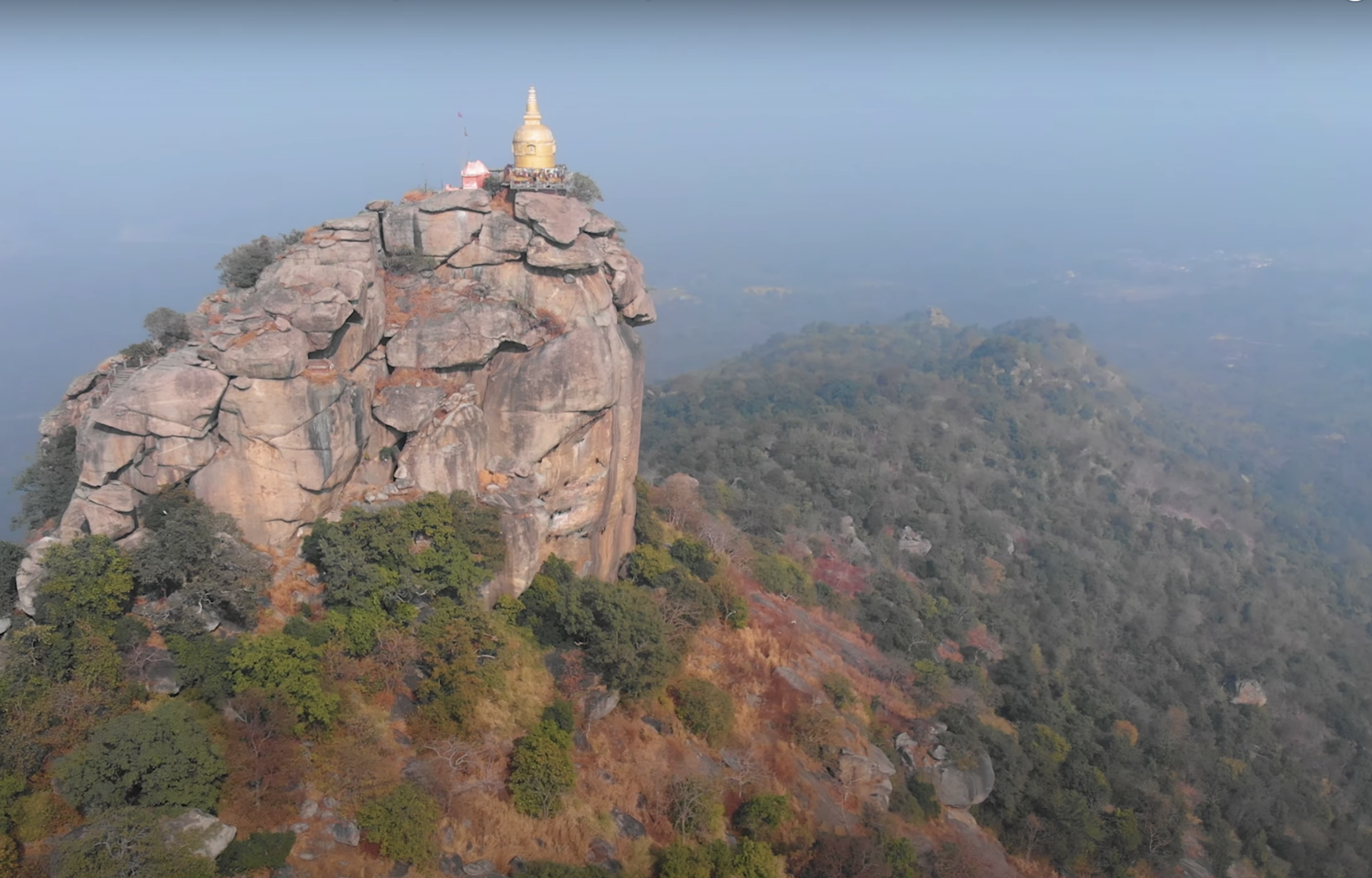
Mount Kukkuṭapāda in Bihar, India where Mahākāśyapa is said to have died

Post-canonical Sanskrit texts such as Avadānas, as well as the travelogues of medieval Chinese pilgrims, numerous Chinese translations, and Southeast Asian vernacular texts, relate Mahākāśyapa's death. (Note: See Strong (2007, p. 45–46). For the Sanskrit texts, see Tournier (2014, pp. 11–12). For the travelogues and the translations, see Kim (2011, pp. 131, 135). For the Southeast Asian texts, see Lagirarde (2006, passim.)) Some of the earliest of these are a Chinese translation from the fourth century CE and the Aśokavadāna, which is dated to the second century CE. They state that Mahākāśyapa's body was enshrined underneath the mountain Kukkuṭapāda (a.k.a. Gurupādaka, in Magadha) where it remains until the arising of the next Buddha, Maitreya (Pali: Mettiya).

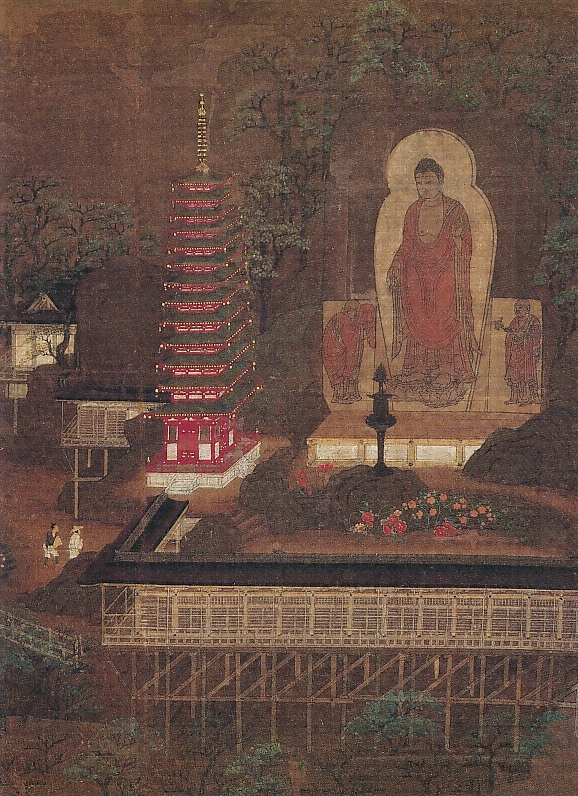
Painting of an image with Maitreya and Mahākāśyapa offering him Gautama Buddha's robe. Kasagidera Temple, Kasagi, Kyoto. The original eight-century colossal cliff-face image depicted here was destroyed by fire at an uncertain date.

A Thai text relates that Mahākāśyapa knew through his meditation that he was about to die and attain paranirvāṇa on the next day. The day after, he informed his pupils of his death and taught them, then went for alms, wearing the robe he had received from the Buddha. In the texts on discipline from the Mūlasarvāstivāda tradition, it says he also went to pay his respects to the Buddha's relics. In several texts, he attempted to visit King Ajātaśatru, but the king was asleep. Mahākāśyapa then cleaned the monastery, and proceeded to Kukkuṭapāda, the place of burial he had selected. He gave a final teaching to the lay people, and performed supernatural accomplishments.

Having settled in a cave there in the middle of three peaks, he covered himself in the robe he had received from the Buddha. (Note: See Tournier (2014, p. 12); Kim (2011, p. 131) and Lagirarde (2006, p. 86). For the covering, see Tournier. For the cave, see Kim. For the three peaks, see Lagirarde.) The texts then state he took a vow that his body would stay there until the arriving of Maitreya Buddha, which is an uncountable number of years. His body would not decay in that time, but become visible and disintegrate in the time of Maitreya Buddha. (Note: Tournier (2014, pp. 13, 16). For the uncountable number, see Adamek (2011, Bodhidharma's Robe). For the visibility, see Lagirarde (2006, p. 88).) (Note: The Sanskrit Sūtra on Maitreya's Birth has it that it was Gautama Buddha who told him to do so. Ray explains that this state of meditation, called nirodha-samāpatti, is associated with the prolonging of life, invulnerability to fire, and the attainment of Nirvana.) Though Mahākāśyapa died after the vow, his body remained intact according to his resolution. The three mountain peaks then closed in on the body. Later, King Ajātaśatru heard about the news of Mahākāśyapa's passing, and fainted of grief. He wanted to visit Mahākāśyapa once more. Ānanda and King Ajātaśatru went to the mountain, which slightly opened, just enough for the two to see Mahākāśyapa's body. In the Mūlasarvāstivāda discipline and the Aśokāvadāna, the king wanted to cremate the body, but Ānanda told him it would remain until the time of Maitreya Buddha. When they left, the mountain closed up again. Later, emperor Aśoka would also visit the mountain with the monk Upagupta, after the latter took him to see the stūpa of the Buddha's disciples.

The accounts then continue that in the future, in the time of Maitreya Buddha, the mountain opens upon his visit, in "the way a cakravartin opens a city gate". However, people in Maitreya Buddha's time are much taller than during the time of Gautama Buddha. In one text, Maitreya Buddha's disciples are therefore contemptuous of Mahākāśyapa, whose head is no larger than an insect to them. Gautama Buddha's robe barely covers two of their fingers, making them marvel how small Gautama Buddha was. (Note: See Strong (2007, p. 220). Buswell & Lopez (2013, Maitreya) also mention the two fingers.) Eventually, in several accounts, Maitreya Buddha takes Mahākāśyapa's body in his hands, explains to his pupils what great person he was, and sees the body miraculously burn in his hands, according to Mahākāśyapa's vow. (Note: For the Pāli account, see Strong (2007, p. 220). For the Thai account, see Lagirarde (2006, p. 86). For a Chinese account, see Deeg (1999, p. 158). For Maitreya Buddha's explanation, see Larigarde and Deeg.) But in the well-known account of Xuanzang, as well as the Tocharian Maitreyasamitināṭaka and other accounts, Mahākāśyapa is alive and waiting in his "cavern of meditation", until the time of Maitreya: he hands over the robe to Maitreya Buddha explaining who it is from, and expresses his joy at having met two Buddhas. He then hovers in the air, displays supernatural accomplishments that are reminiscent of Gautama Buddha, and bursts miraculously into flames. (Note: See Kim (2011, p. 135) and Adamek (2011, Bodhidharma's Robe). Kim mentions the supernatural accomplishments; Adamek says that Xuanzang's account is well-known. Kumamoto (2002, p. 5) mentions the Tocharian text. For the words of Mahākāśyapa and the mention of other accounts, see Strong (2007, p. 219). For the expression "cavern of meditation", see Ray (1994, p. 114). For the reminiscence, see Deeg (1999, p. 158 note 39).) In the Mūlasarvāstivāda discipline and the Aśokāvadāna, the account ends with Maitreya Buddha's disciples attaining arhat, as the encounter has caused their pride to be humbled. (Note: For the Mūlasarvāstivāda texts, see Lagirarde (2006, p. 89). For the Aśokāvadāna and the pride, see Ray (1994, p. 109).)

==== Cults and practices ====
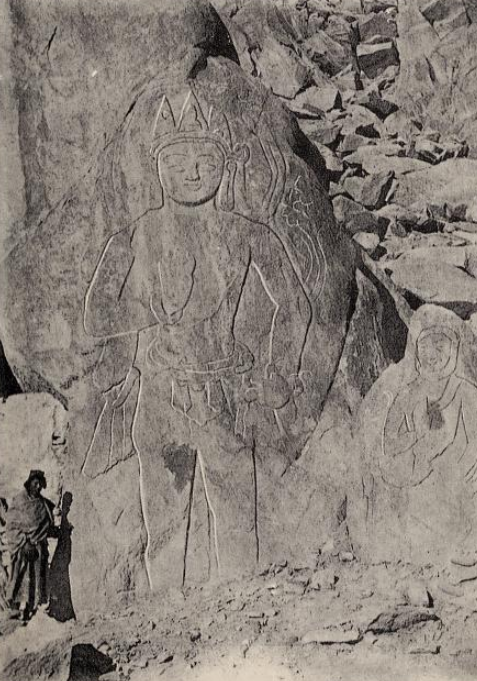
Image of Maitreya, Tibet, 10th century. Deeg (1999, p. 167 note 76) identifies the image at the right with Mahākāśyapa.

The Kukkuṭapāda Mountain was identified by traditional authors with several places in North India, and some of these places had become famous place of pilgrimage and cult by the time the Chinese pilgrim Faxian (337–c.422 CE) and later Xuanzang visited. (Note: For pilgrimage, see Strong (2007, p. 219). For the cult, see Ray (1994, pp. 114–115).) These pilgrimage places, featuring depictions of Mahākāśyapa, have been connected by Buddhist studies scholar Vincent Tournier with an aspiration to be born in Maitreya's following.

In sixth-century Chinese steles, Mahākāśyapa is often depicted waiting for Maitreya Buddha in the cave, cloaked in the robe and a hood. He is given a role as successor of the Gautama Buddha. Buddhist studies scholar Miyaji Akira proposes that Mahākāśyapa waiting in the cave became the basis of a theme in Korean Buddhist art featuring monks meditating in caves. Korean studies scholar Sunkyung Kim does point out, however, that similar motifs can already be found in earlier Buddhist art, showing Buddha Gautama sitting. The story of Mahākāśyapa awaiting Maitreya Buddha had an important impact in Japan, up until early modern times. Jikigyō (1671–c.1724), the leader of a chiliastic religious movement, locked himself in his monastic cell to starve to death, and have his mummified corpse meet with Maitreya Buddha in the future.

With regard to South- and Southeast Asia, the interest in the relationship between Maitreya and Mahākāśyapa spread to Ceylon during the reign of Kassapa II (652–661) and Kassapa V (929–939). They most likely honored Mahākāśyapa for his role in the Abhidharma recitations at the First Council. Kassapa V identified with Mahākāśyapa (Pali: Mahākassapa) and aspired to be reborn with Maitreya as well. Presently, the account of Mahākāśyapa's parinirvāṇa is not widely recognized in dominant Buddhist traditions in Thailand, but Lagirarde raises the question whether this is only a recent development. It is still a common belief among the Thai that the body of a very pure and venerated monk will not decompose.

==== Scholarly analysis ====
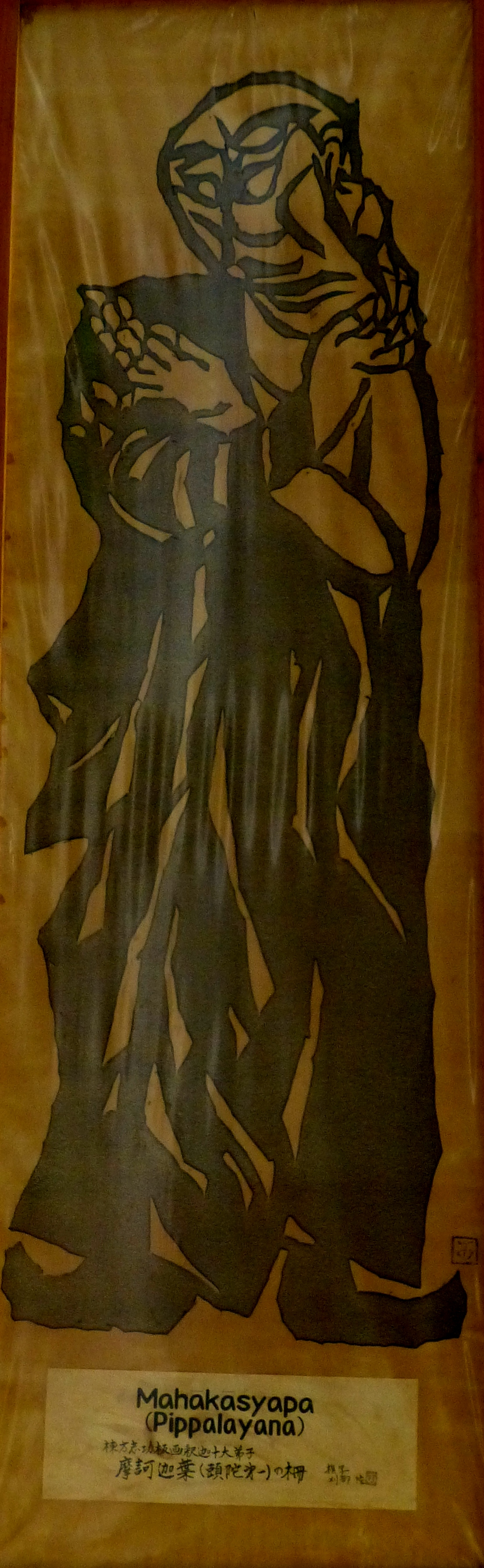
Mahākāśyapa, woodblock print by Munakata Shiko, Japan, 1939

In the early texts, Mahākāśyapa is depicted as the keeper of the Buddhist teaching during the First Council; in the story of him awaiting Maitreya Buddha this role is extended. In some early Chinese texts, Mahākāśyapa is seen stating to Ānanda that all devotees present at the parinirvāṇa of the Buddha Gautama will be reborn in Tusita heaven and meet Maitreya; in the story of the cave this association with Maitreya is further extended. Since the end of Mahākāśyapa's life after the First Council was not discussed in the early texts, his demise, or the postponement thereof, naturally gave rise to legends.

Tournier speculates that the story of Mahākāśyapa resolving that his body endure until the next Buddha is a "conscious attempt to dress the arhat in a bodhisattva (Buddha-to-be) garb". On a similar note, Strong argues the story shows sentiments that are at the root of the bodhisattva ideal, and may have led to the idea of the Eighteen Arhats (pinyin: lo-han) that "postpone" their death to protect the Buddhist teaching till the arrival of Maitreya. Indologist Padmanabh Jaini argues that the story was created by the Mūlasarvāstivādins to connect Maitreya Buddha to Gautama Buddha, through a line of transmission. In this, they may have been influenced by the Indo-Greeks and Persians, who ruled the area where the Mūlasarvāstivādins lived. (Note: Just like Jaini, Silk mentions there may be influence from Iranian traditions. Buddhist studies scholar Jan Nattier notes the resemblance with the Iranian figure Kərəsaspa, a similar name, who waits in suspended animation for his savior Saošyant.) Historian Max Deeg raises the question, however, that if Jaini is correct, why no traces of an early development of the legend can be found. Silk also hypothesizes that the story was developed by Mahāyāna authors to create a narrative to connect the two Buddhas physically through Mahākāśyapa's paranirvāṇa and the passing on of the robe. Lagirarde notes, however, that not all Āgama sources insist on connecting the two Buddhas. Furthermore, Pāli, Thai and Laotian sources do not mention the passing on of the robe, yet the meeting is still narrated as significant. (Note: Lagirarde (2006, p. 91). Lagirarde cites Jaini (1988, p. 75). Silk explains his ideas in Silk (2003, pp. 175–176).) Silk also notes that the Sanskrit texts the Abhiniṣkramaṇa Sūtra, the Mahāprajñāpāramitōpadeśa and the Divyāvadāna contain the story of Mahākāśyapa under the mountain, and do not mention the robe of the Buddha at all. But in every version of the account there is a physical connection between Gautama Buddha, Mahākāśyapa and Maitreya Buddha. He concludes that Mahāyāna authors used Mahākāśyapa as a way to legitimize the Mahāyāna teachings, by affirming that there were more authentic teachings which had not yet come.

Translator Saddhatissa, and with him Silk, argue that there is no equivalent account about Mahākāśyapa waiting in the cave that can be found in the Pāli tradition apart from a single reference in a post-canonical text. But Lagirarde points out that the reference found by Saddhatissa and Silk (called the Mahāsampiṇḍanidāna, which Saddhatissa dates to the twelfth century) does indicate the story was known in the Pāli tradition. Lagirarde also lists several later vernacular texts from Theravāda countries that mention the account, in the Siamese, Northern Thai and Laotian languages. Indeed, Silk himself points at a Pāli sub-commentary to the Aṅguttara Nikāya which mentions that Mahākāśyapa retreated at age hundred twenty in a cave close to where the First Council was held. He would dwell there and "make the Buddha's teaching last for 5000 years". The First Council itself was held in a cave too, and it may have led to the motif of Mahākāśyapa waiting in a cave. Furthermore, in some canonical Pāli texts Mahākāśyapa talks about the decay and disappearance of the Buddhist dispensation, which may also have been a foundation for the story.

=== In Mahāyāna discourses ===
In general, Sanskrit texts often mention Mahākāśyapa. Silk argues that Mahāyāna polemicists used Mahākāśyapa as an interlocutor in their discourses, because of his stern conservative stance in the early texts and opposition of innovation, and his close association with Gautama Buddha. This fit with the conservative ideas on Buddhist practice among the early Mahāyāna authors, and the need to legitimize Mahāyāna doctrine, surrounding them with an aura of authenticity. Bhikkhu Anālayo surveys different roles of Mahākāśyapa in early Mahāyāna sūtra literature, identifying different authentication strategies that range from presenting him as a faithful student of Mahāyāna teaching to ridiculing him, such as when he is on record for starting to dance at hearing a celestial play music.

==== In Chan Buddhism ====
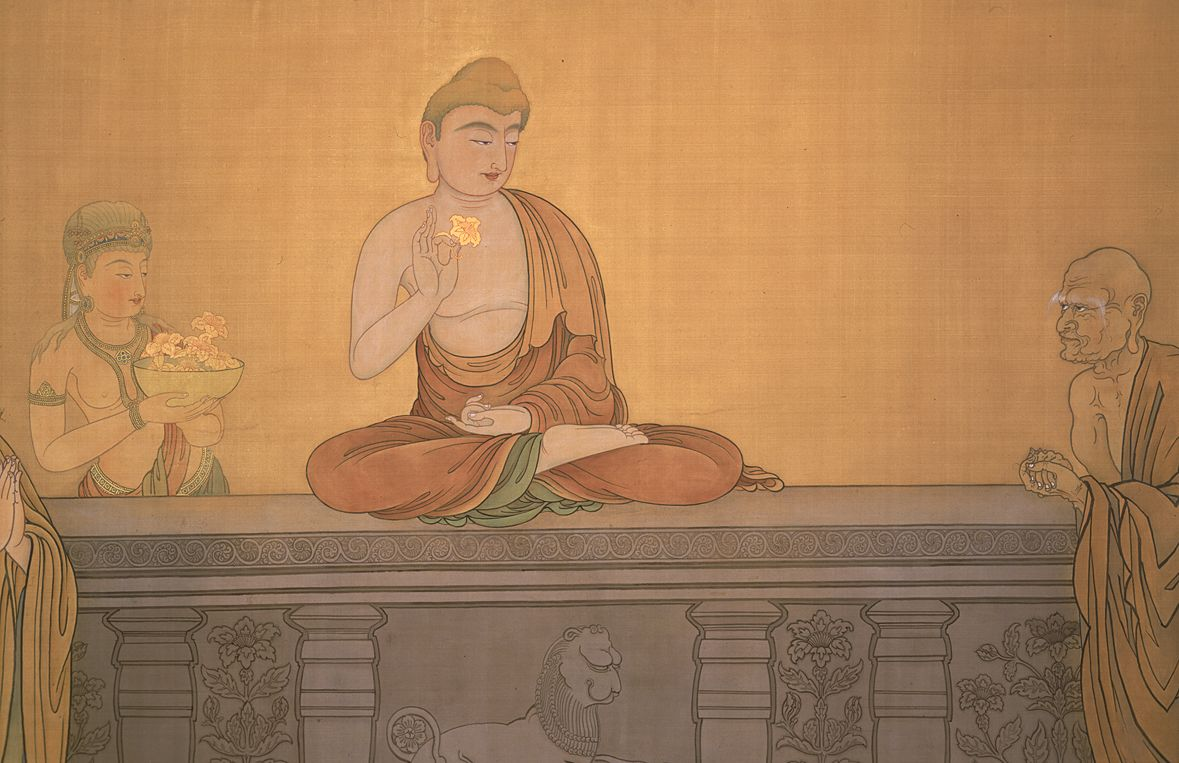
Mahākāśyapa smiling at the lotus flower, by Hishida Shunsō, 1897, Nihonga style

Mahākāśyapa has a significant role in texts from the Chan tradition. In East Asia, there is a Chan and Zen tradition, first recounted in The Jingde Record of the Transmission of the Lamp (Chinese: 景德傳燈錄; pinyin: Tiansheng Guangdeng-lu), which is a 1036 genealogical record about Chan Buddhism. According to this tradition, Mahākāśyapa once received a direct "transmission" from Gautama Buddha. Chan and Zen purport to lead their adherents to insights akin to that mentioned by the Buddha in the Flower Sermon (Chinese: 拈華微笑; pinyin: Nianhua weixiao; lit. 'Holding up a flower and smiling subtly') (Note: The English title Flower Sermon is a Western invention. It is also known as the "First Zen Story".) given on the Vulture Peak, in which he held up a white flower and just admired it in his hand, without speaking. All the disciples just looked on without knowing how to react, but only Mahākāśyapa smiled faintly, and the Buddha picked him as one who truly understood him and was worthy to be the one receiving a special "mind-to-mind transmission" (pinyin: yixin chuanxin). (Note: For the intention of Zen and the Flower Sermon, see Tarrant County College, 2007, p. 11). For the Vulture Peak, see Hershock, P. (2019). "Chan Buddhism". The Stanford Encyclopedia of Philosophy. Metaphysics Research Lab, Stanford University. Archived from the original on 11 September 2019. For the Chinese terms, see Buswell & Lopez (2013, nianhua weixiao).)

Thus, a way within Buddhism developed which concentrated on direct experience rather than on rational creeds or revealed scriptures. Chan therefore became a method of meditative religion which seek to enlighten people in the manner that Mahākāśyapa experienced: "A special transmission outside the scriptures, directly pointing at the heart of man, looking into one's own nature." This transmission was then purportedly passed on by the Buddha to Mahākāśyapa, who then passed it on to a long list of Indian and Chinese patriarchs, eventually reaching Bodhidharma (5th or 6th century CE), who brought Chan Buddhism to China, and passed it on to Huike (487–593 CE). The Jingde Record took the passing on of the robe from Buddha Gautama to Mahākāśyapa to refer to a secret transmission of Chan teachings, within the specific Chan lineage.

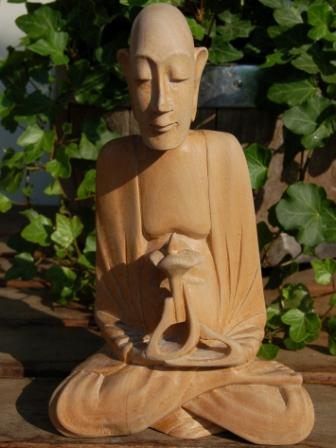
Mahākāśyapa holding a flower

The story of the Flower Sermon was also recorded in later texts, between the 11th and 14th centuries. At least one of these texts was probably written to defend the authenticity of the Flower Sermon, which was even questioned in Chan circles. Eventually, the story became well known among both Buddhist monks and Chan-oriented literati. It was incorporated as a meditative topic in the 1228 Chan text The Gateless Barrier (pinyin: Wumen Guan), in which the Buddha confirmed that the mind-to-mind transmission was complete. (Note: See Buswell & Lopez (2013, nianhua weixiao) and Harvey (2013, p. 222). Harvey states that the story originated among the "Chan literati".) Although the Flower Sermon's main point is to depict a wordless special transmission "outside the teaching", the tradition was defended and authorized through Buddhist scripture.

The Flower Sermon event is regarded by modern scholars as an invention, but does provide insight into the philosophical concerns and identity of Chan Buddhism. Since Chan Buddhism values the direct transmission from the teacher's mind to that of the student, more so than scriptures, the unbroken lineage of patriarchs is an important part of the tradition. Moreover, whereas in many Buddhist traditions it was recounted that Mahākāśyapa would pass on Gautama Buddha's robe to Maitreya Buddha, in Chan a different tradition developed, in which Mahākāśyapa passed on the robe to the next patriarch Ānanda, and so on through a list of Indian and Chinese patriarchs. Some Chan masters, such as Dōgen (1200–1253), did believe that this robe would eventually be passed forward to Mahākāśyapa and eventually Maitreya.

As Japanese Buddhist texts saw the transmission of Gautama Buddha's robe as a symbol of birth and gestation, similarly, the flower in the Flower Sermon was seen as a symbol of death and cremation. Besides the Flower Sermon, the appearance of the Buddha's feet when Mahākāśyapa pays his final respects, as well as the Buddha sharing his seat with Mahākāśyapa are also considered mind-to-mind transmissions.

== Legacy ==
=== Values ===
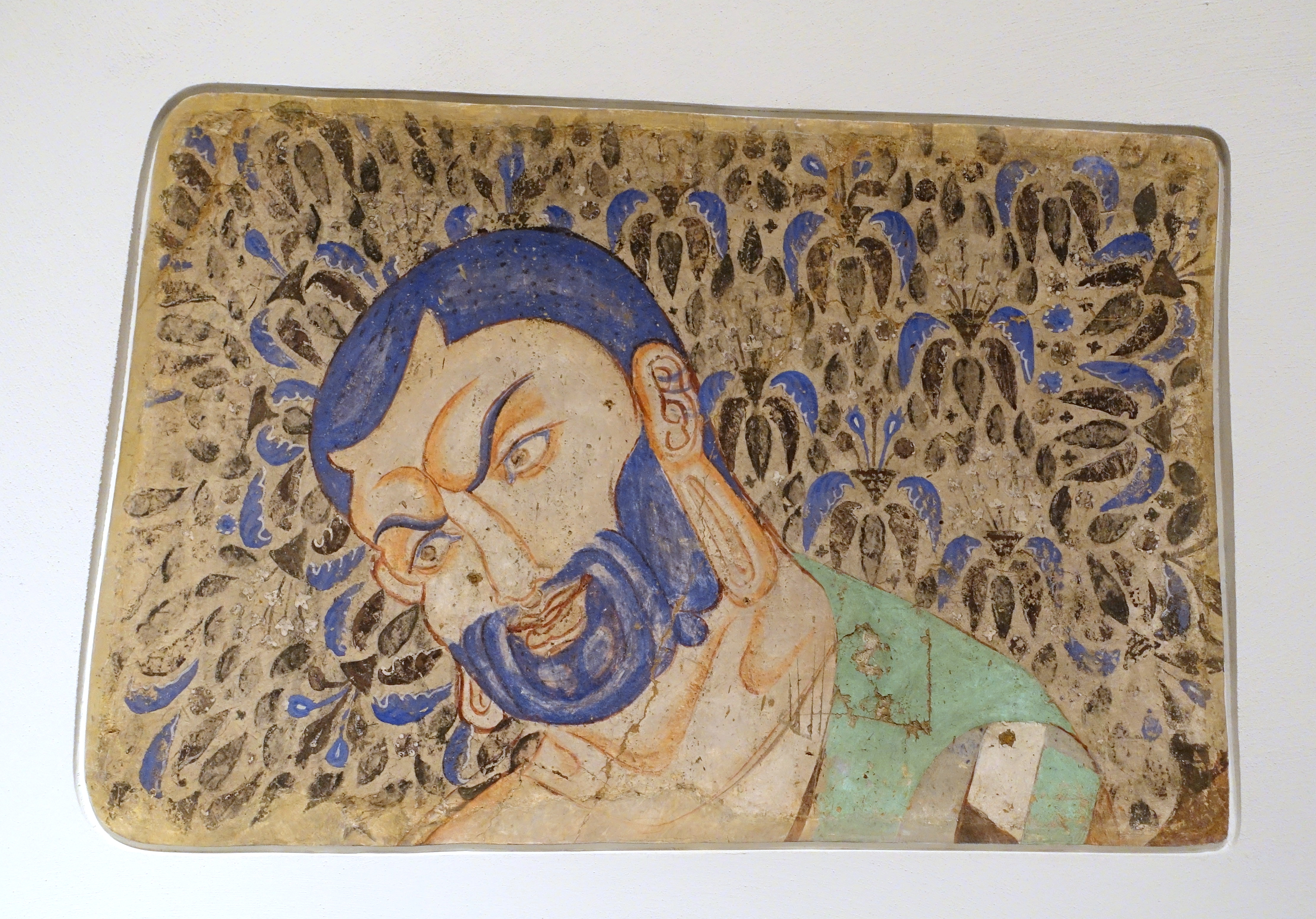
Mahākāśyapa depicted with hair and beard. Mural painting, Kizil Caves, Xinjiang, China, fourth–fifth century CE

Being one of the most well-known disciples of the Buddha, Mahākāśyapa embodies the highest ideals of early Buddhist monasticism. (Note: Ray (1994, p. 105), cited in Clarke (2014, p. 110).) Buddhist studies scholar Asanga Tilakaratne points out that Mahākāśyapa's ascetic and austere values and dislike for women on the one hand, and Ānanda's active, city-dwelling values and support for women on the other hand, are two sides of the spectrum than can be seen throughout the history of Buddhist monasticism. Monastic vocations and monastic orders tend to be along these two ends of the spectrum, with compassionate engagement on the one hand, and dispassionate detachment on the other hand. This can be traced back to these two disciples. Specifically, the Theravāda tradition has been influenced much by the model of Mahākāśyapa. In some early Theravāda texts about Mahākāśyapa, the values of forest renunciation are contrasted with that of settled monasticism. Renunciation in the forest is considered superior, and settled monasticism is considered a deterioration of the holy life.

Przyluski and several other scholars have argued that in the early texts, Mahākaśyapa represents ascetic and brahmin values. (Note: See Analayo (2010, p. 14, note 42), Analayo (2016, p. 173) and Clarke (2014, p. 107). Only Anālayo mentions both.) The ascetic values are seen in the account in which Mahākaśyapa refuses to give up ascetic practices, going against the advice of the Buddha. Such refusal was highly unusual for a disciple of the Buddha. The brahmin values can be observed from the account of the accusations leveled against Ānanda, which appear to be based more on brahmin values than violations of monastic discipline. Both these brahmin and ascetic values, as represented by the figure of Mahākaśyapa, would lead to strong opposition to the founding of the bhikṣunī order in early Buddhism. The ascetic values Mahākāśyapa represented, however, were a reaction to less austere tendencies that appeared in early Buddhism at the time.

Ray concludes that the texts present Mahākāśyapa in different ways. Mahākāśyapa assumes many roles and identities in the texts, that of a renunciant saint, a lawgiver, an anti-establishment figure, but also a "guarantor of future justice" in the time of Maitreya. Indologist C.A.F. Rhys Davids (1857–1942) stated he was "both the anchorite and the friend of mankind, even of the outcast". His figure unites the opposites of established monasticism and forest renunciation, and "transcends any particular Buddhist group or set of interests". Drawing from Przyluski's textual criticism, Ray argues that when Mahākāśyapa replaced Kauṇḍinya as the head of the saṃgha after the Buddha's death, his ascetic saint-like role was appropriated into the monastic establishment to serve the need for a charismatic leader. This led him to possess both the character of the anti-establishment ascetic, as well as that of the settled monastic governor.

=== Eldest son of the Buddha ===
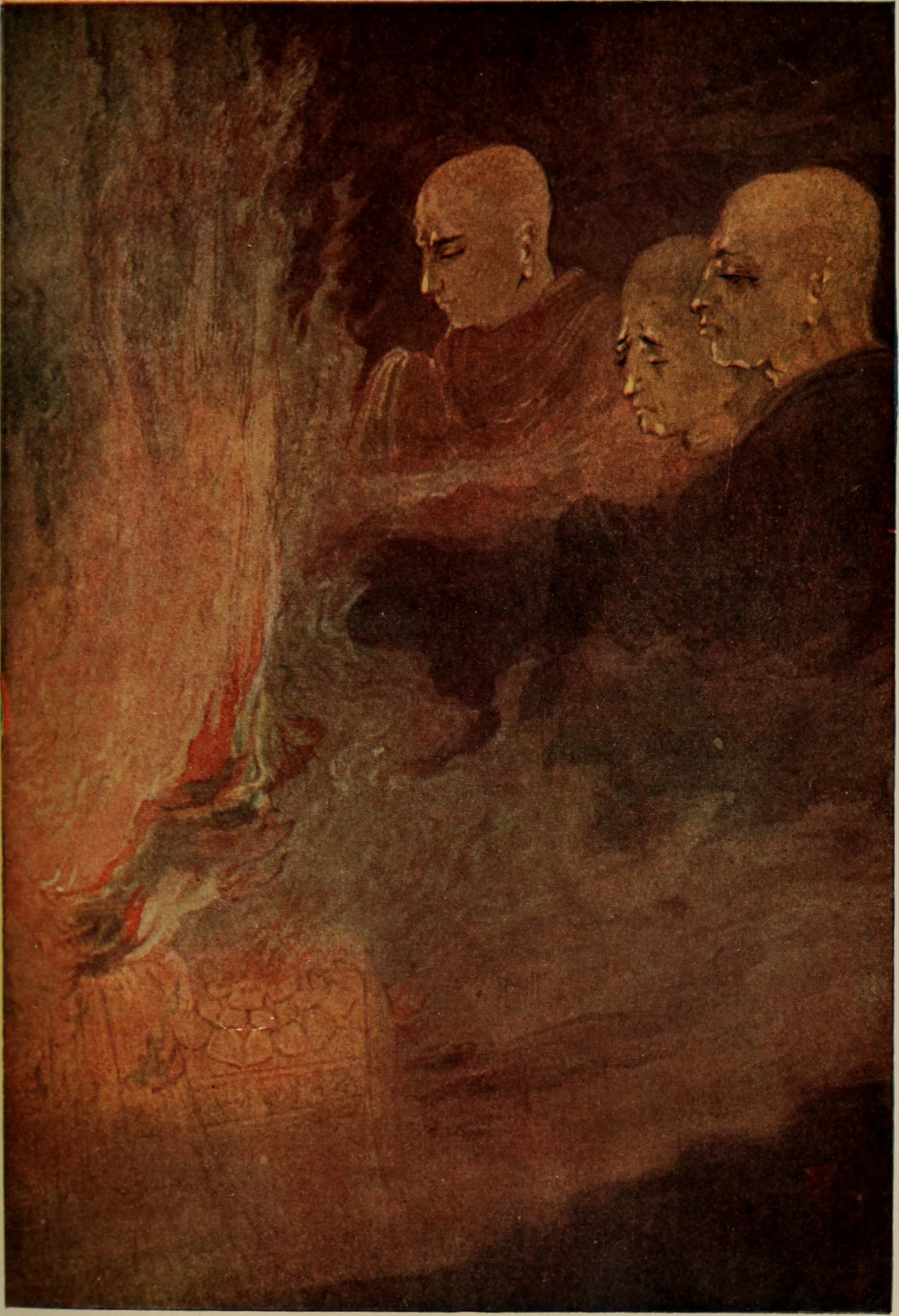
Funeral pyre of the Buddha being lit at the arrival of Mahākāśyapa, from Buddha and the Gospel of Buddhism, Ananda Coomaraswamy, 1916

In Abhidharma texts of several Buddhist schools, the fulfilment of Mahākāśyapa's vow in the mountain Kukuṭapada is connected to a vow Gautama Buddha took to prevent his body from being cremated before Mahākāśyapa's arrival at his teacher's cremation grounds. Buddhist studies scholar Gregory Schopen analyzes several post-canonical Buddhist texts and concludes that in both instances, a vow is taken based on psychic powers, which is then shown to be effective after the death of the person with those psychic powers. Mahākāśyapa's psychic powers are needed for his role in the texts as the one who preserves the Buddha's dispensation. Indeed, later Buddhist texts depict Mahākāśyapa as the eldest son of the Buddha, who leads both the funerals of his father and, as his heir, presides over the First Council. Eventually, he came to be seen as the first teacher after the Buddha and as the beginning of a lineage of teachers. This conceptualization is found within several Buddhist schools, including the Theravādins and the Mahāsaṅghikas. Indeed, Theravāda sees him as a sort of "Father of the Church".

=== Historical lineages ===
Furthermore, Mahākāśyapa is described in the Pāli commentary to the Dīgha Nikāya as the person responsible for the preservation of collection that was the precursor to the Saṃyutta Nikāya and the Saṃyuktaka Āgama. In both the Nikāya and Āgama version of this same collection, therefore, a great deal of attention is given to him, and Tournier thinks it possible that the lineage of teachers preserving this collection, probably originating from the Sthāviras, also conceived themselves as preservers of Mahākāśyapa's legacy. This is also reflected in the language used in inscriptions from the Sinhalese monk Mahānāman (5th–6th century CE) and in later texts used in the Sinhalese tradition, which both connect Mahānāman's lineage with that of Mahākāśyapa, and also that of the future Buddha Maitreya. However, some Pāli sources indicate that Mahākāśyapa was part of the lineage of the Aṅguttara Nikāya reciters instead.

One of the early Buddhist schools, the Kāśyapīyas (Pali: Kassapīya), was founded by Mahākāśyapa, according to scholars Paramārtha (499–569) and Kuiji (632–682). Other traditional scholars have argued instead it was another Kāśyapa, who lived three centuries after the Buddha. When the differences between the early Buddhist schools grew more prominent, the Mahāsaṅghikas affiliated themselves with the figure of Mahākāśyapa, and claimed him as their founder and patron-saint. They presented themselves as more orthodox than other schools, such as Theravāda.

=== In art and culture ===
In Mahāyāna iconography, Ānanda is often depicted flanking the Buddha at the right side, together with Mahākāśyapa at the left. Temple of Heaven Garden in Shantou, China.

In Buddhist art, depictions of Mahākāśyapa have "left an indelible mark". He was depicted in paranirvāṇa scenes as a reassurance that Gautama Buddha's dispensation would not be lost; he was depicted next to Maitreya Buddha as an anticipatory vision of the future. The scene in which he paid his final respects to the Buddha became a well-known depiction in Buddhist art, and Strong has argued that it may have led to the cult of the Buddha's footprints.

In Chinese art, Mahākāśyapa is usually depicted with a long beard and hair. Buddhist studies scholar Mun-Keat Choong hypothesizes that these depictions found their way back in at least one Chinese Buddhist discourse, the discourse in which Mahākāśyapa is criticized for looking inappropriate. This may have been the work of the translators. In Mahāyāna iconography, Mahākāśyapa is often depicted flanking the Buddha at the left side, together with Ānanda at the right. The two disciples have been very popular in art depictions since the time of Greco-Buddhism, and Migot argued that the tradition of Mahākāśyapa and Ānanda being the Buddha's two main disciples was older than that of the tradition of Śāriputra and Maudgalyāyana, because in the Mahāparinibbāna Sutta only the former pair features, and the traditional explanation for this that Śāriputra and Maudgalyāyana did not outlive the Buddha seems unconvincing. (Note: As for Theravāda iconography, Mahākāśyapa is usually not depicted flanking the Buddha.) In Chan temples, the image of Mahākāśyapa is often placed in a central position, being the first patriarch of the tradition. In the history of Mahāyāna Buddhism, as the rag-robe asceticism of Mahākāśyapa contributed to his legendary figure and the legitimation of the Mahāyāna creed, rag-robes became an icon in East Asian Buddhism. The Buddha's disciples and founders of East Asian Buddhism were often depicted in them. When fukudenkai sewing groups were founded in Japan in the early twentieth century, to introduce sewing robes for monastics as a spiritual practice, they often referred to the early Buddhist account of Mahākāśyapa receiving the rag-robes from the Buddha. Fukudenkai practitioners usually use second-hand clothes to sew the rag-robes, just like in the time of the Buddha.

In May 2022, Sushant More, a botany researcher from Mumbai, Maharashtra discovered a new plant Lepidagathis mahakassapae endemic to the state and named it after Mahākāśyapa, following the Pāli spelling of his name.

== Citations ==
- Adamek, W.L. (2011), The Teachings of Master Wuzhu: Zen and Religion of No-Religion, Columbia University Press, ISBN 978-0-231-52792-7
- Ambros, Barbara R (27 June 2016), "A Rite of Their Own: Japanese Buddhist Nuns and the Anan kōshiki", Japanese Journal of Religious Studies, 43 (1): 207–250, doi:10.18874/jjrs.43.1.2016.207-250
- Analayo, B. (2010), "Once Again on Bakkula" (PDF), The Indian International Journal of Buddhist Studies, 11: 1–28
- Analayo, B. (2015), "Pratyekabuddhas in the Ekottarika-āgama", Journal of the Oxford Centre for Buddhist Studies, 8, archived from the original on 13 December 2019
- Analayo, B. (2016), The Foundation History of the Nuns' Order (PDF), projekt verlag, ISBN 978-3-89733-387-1
- Analayo, B. (2026), "Changing Roles of Mahākāśyapa in Āgama/Vinaya and Early Mahāyāna Literature; Together with an Appendix by Jens-Uwe Hartmann on the status of Śāriputra According to the Pravāraṇa-sūtra" (PDF), Annual Report of the International Research Institute for Advanced Buddhology at Soka University, 29: 55–92
- Aronson, H.B. (1996), Love and Sympathy in Theravāda Buddhism, Motilal Banarsidass Publishers, ISBN 978-81-208-1403-5
- Bapat, P. (1956), 2500 Years of Buddhism, Ministry of Information and Broadcasting (India), OCLC 851201287
- Bareau, André (1979), "III. La composition et les étapes de la formation progressive du Mahàparinirvânasûtra ancien" [3. The Composition and the Episodes of the Progressive Formation of the ancient Mahāparinirvānasūtra], Bulletin de l'École française d'Extrême-Orient (in French), 66 (1): 45–103, doi:10.3406/befeo.1979.4010
- Baruah, Bibhuti (2000), Buddhist Sects and Sectarianism, Sarup & Sons, ISBN 9788176251525
- Bautze-Picron, C. (2010), The Murals of Temple 1077 in Pagan (Burma) and Their Innovative Features, Hyper Articles en Ligne, hal-00638395
- Bodhi, B. (2000), "Disciples, Early Buddhist", in Johnston, W.M. (ed.), Encyclopedia of Monasticism, Routledge, pp. 387–389, ISBN 978-1-57958-090-2
- Buswell, Robert E. Jr.; Lopez, Donald S. Jr. (2013), Princeton Dictionary of Buddhism, Princeton University Press, p. 1304, ISBN 978-0-691-15786-3
- Clarke, S. (2014), Family Matters in Indian Buddhist Monasticisms, University of Hawai'i Press, ISBN 978-0-8248-3647-4
- Deeg, M. (1999), "Das Ende des Dharma und die Ankunft des Maitreya" [The End of the Dharma and the Coming of Maitreya], Zeitschrift für Religionswissenschaft (in German), 7 (2): 145–170, doi:10.1515/0031.145, S2CID 171036201
- Do-Ryun, Do (March 1964), "Sun Buddhism in Korea", Korea Journal, 4 (1): 41–47, archived from the original on 17 February 2020
- Dutt, N. (1925), Early History of the Spread of Buddhism and the Buddhist Schools (PDF), Luzac & Co., OCLC 659567197
- Dutt, N. (1941), Early Monastic Buddhism, vol. 1, Calcutta Oriental Press, OCLC 26553791
- Edkins, Joseph (2013), Chinese Buddhism: A Volume of Sketches, Historical, Descriptive and Critical, Routledge, ISBN 978-1-136-37881-2
- Faure, Bernard (1995), "Quand l'habit fait le moine: The Symbolism of the Kāsāya in Sōtō zen", Cahiers d'Extrême-Asie, 8: 335–369, doi:10.3406/asie.1995.1101
- Findly, Ellison Banks (September 1992), "Ānanda's Hindrance: Faith (saddhā) in Early Buddhism", Journal of Indian Philosophy, 20 (3): 253–273, doi:10.1007/BF00157758, S2CID 169332149
- Findly, Ellison Banks (2003), Dāna: Giving and Getting in Pāli Buddhism, Motilal Banarsidass Publishers, ISBN 9788120819566
- Franke, R.O. (1908), "The Buddhist Councils at Rajagaha and Vesali as Alleged in Cullavagga 11, 12" (PDF), Journal of the Pali Text Society, 6: 1–80, archived from the original (PDF) on 27 November 2010
- Frauwallner, E. (1956), The Earliest Vinaya and the Beginnings of Buddhist Literature (PDF), Orientale Roma, vol. 8, Istituto italiano per il Medio ed Estremo Oriente, OCLC 829856062
- Gethin, Rupert (2008), Sayings of the Buddha: A Selection of Suttas from the Pali Nikāyas, Oxford University Press, ISBN 978-0-19-283925-1
- Gombrich, R. (2018), Buddhism and Pali, Mud Pie Books, ISBN 978-0-9934770-4-1
- Harvey, P. (2013), An Introduction to Buddhism: Teachings, History and Practices (2nd ed.), Cambridge University Press, ISBN 978-0-521-85942-4
- Heim, M. (2004), "Kassapa", in Jestice, P.G. (ed.), Holy People of the World: A Cross-cultural Encyclopedia, ABC-CLIO, pp. 467–468, ISBN 1-85109-649-3
- Hinüber, O. von (5 November 2007), "The Advent of the First Nuns in Early Buddhism" (PDF), Indogaku Chibettogaku Kenkyū [Journal of Indian and Tibetan Studies], Association for the Study of Indian Philosophy: 222–37, ISSN 1342-7377, archived from the original (PDF) on 10 September 2018
- Hirakawa, Akira (1993), A History of Indian Buddhism: From Śākyamuni to Early Mahāyāna, Motilal Banarsidass Publishers, ISBN 9788120809550
- Jaini, P.S. (1988), "Bodhisattva Career of the Tathāgata Maitreya", in Sponberg, A.; Hardacre, H. (eds.), Maitreya, the Future Buddha, Cambridge University Press, pp. 54–90, ISBN 0-521-34344-5
- Jorgensen, J. (2000), "Bodhidharma; Chan/Zen: China", in Johnston, W.M. (ed.), Encyclopedia of Monasticism, Routledge, pp. 158–162, 269–272, ISBN 978-1-57958-090-2
- Karaluvinna, M. (2002), "Mahākassapa", in Malalasekera, G.P.; Weeraratne, W.G. (eds.), Encyclopaedia of Buddhism, vol. 6, Government of Sri Lanka, fascicle 3, pp. 435–441
- Keown, Damien (2004), A Dictionary of Buddhism, Oxford University Press, ISBN 978-0-19-157917-2
- Kim, Sunkyung (2011), "Awakened, Awaiting, or Meditating?: Readdressing a Silla Period Image from the Buddha Valley on Mount Nam", Journal of Korean Studies, 16 (1): 119–150, doi:10.1353/jks.2011.0002, S2CID 144724198
- Kumamoto, H. (December 2002), The Maitreya-samiti and Khotanese - Symposium Franco-japonais "Interactions et Translations Culturelles en Eurasie", Paris: University of Tokyo and École pratique des hautes études, archived from the original on 28 October 2019
- Lagirarde, F. (2006), "The Nibbāna of Mahākassapa the Elder", in Lagirarde, F.; Koanantakool, P.C. (eds.), Buddhist Legacies in Mainland Southeast Asia. Mentalities, Interpretations and Practices, Ecole française d'Extrême-Orient and Sirindhorn Anthropology Centre, ISBN 2-85539-655-7
- Lamotte, Etienne (1988) [1958], Histoire du Bouddhisme Indien, des origines a l'ere Saka [History of Indian Buddhism: From the Origins to the Śaka Era] (in French), Université catholique de Louvain, Institut orientaliste, ISBN 90-683-1-100-X
- Lee, S.L. (2010), Surviving Nirvana: Death of the Buddha in Chinese Visual Culture, Hong Kong University Press, ISBN 978-962-209-125-2
- MacQueen, Graeme (2005) [1981–2], "Inspired Speech in Early Mahāyāna Buddhism", in Williams, Paul (ed.), Buddhism: Critical Concepts in Religious Studies, 3: The Origins and Nature of Mahāyāna Buddhism, Routledge, pp. 312–343, ISBN 0-415-33229-X
- Malalasekera, G.P. (1937), Dictionary of Pāli Proper Names, Pali Text Society, OCLC 837021145
- Migot, A. (1954), "Un grand disciple du Buddha: Sāriputra. Son rôle dans l'histoire du bouddhisme et dans le développement de l'Abhidharma" [A great disciple of the Buddha: Sāriputra, his role in Buddhist history and in the development of Abhidharma], Bulletin de l'École française d'Extrême-Orient (in French), 46 (2): 405–554, doi:10.3406/befeo.1954.5607
- Minayev, I.P. (1894), Recherches sur le bouddhisme [Studies in Buddhism] (PDF) (in French), (originally in Russian), Ernest Leroux, OCLC 25136566
- More, Sushant; Kambale, Sharad; Sawant, Mandar; Mane, Rohit; Bhosale, Harshal (July 2022), "Lepidagathis mahakassapae sp. nov. (Acanthaceae: Barlerieae) from the high elevated Lateritic Plateau of northern Western Ghats of Maharashtra, India", Nordic Journal of Botany, 2022 (7) e03345, doi:10.1111/njb.03345, S2CID 249221118 Full access available to users of The Wikipedia Library.
- Morrison, E. (2010), The Power of Patriarchs: Qisong and Lineage in Chinese Buddhism, Brill Publishing, ISBN 978-90-04-18301-8
- Mukherjee, B. (1994), "The Riddle of the First Buddhist Council – A Retrospection", Chung-Hwa Buddhist Journal, 7: 452–73, archived from the original on 17 September 2018
- Mun-keat, Choong (1 March 2017), "A Comparison of the Pāli and Chinese Versions of the Kassapa Saṃyutta, a Collection Of Early Buddhist Discourses on the Venerable Kāśyapa", Journal of the Royal Asiatic Society of Great Britain & Ireland, 27 (2): 295–311, doi:10.1017/S1356186316000559, S2CID 164504702
- Nattier, J. (1988), "The Meanings of the Maitreya Myth: A Typological Analysis", in Sponberg, A.; Hardacre, H. (eds.), Maitreya, the Future Buddha, Cambridge University Press, pp. 23–47, ISBN 0-521-34344-5
- Ohnuma, Reiko (2013), "Bad Nun: Thullanandā in Pāli Canonical and Commentarial Sources" (PDF), Journal of Buddhist Ethics, 20, archived (PDF) from the original on 1 October 2018
- Oldenberg, H. (1899), "Buddhistische Studien" [Buddhist Studies], Zeitschrift der Deutschen Morgenländischen Gesellschaft (in German), 53 (4): 613–694, JSTOR 43366938
- Powers, John (2007), Introduction to Tibetan Buddhism, Shambhala Publications, ISBN 978-1-55939-835-0
- Powers, John (2016), "Buddhas and Buddhisms", in Powers, John (ed.), The Buddhist World, Routledge, ISBN 978-0-415-61044-5
- Prebish, Charles S. (2005) [1974], "Review of Scholarship on Buddhist Councils", in Williams, Paul (ed.), Buddhism: Critical Concepts in Religious Studies, 1: Early History in South and Southeast Asia, Routledge, pp. 224–243, ISBN 0-415-33227-3
- Przyluski, J. (1926), Le concile de Rājagṛha, introduction à l'histoire des canons et des sectes bouddhiques [The Council of Rājagṛha: Introduction to the History of the Buddhist Canons and Sects] (PDF) (in French), Paul Geuthner, OCLC 470097020
- Ray, R.A. (1994), Buddhist Saints in India: A Study in Buddhist Values and Orientations, Oxford University Press, ISBN 0-19-507202-2
- Rhys Davids, C.A.F. (1914), "Love (Buddhist)" (PDF), in Hastings, James; Selbie, John Alexander; Gray, Louis H. (eds.), Encyclopaedia of Religion and Ethics, vol. 8, T. & T. Clark, pp. 159–162, OCLC 614111002
- Riggs, D.E. (2004), "Fukudenkai: Sewing the Buddha's Robe in Contemporary Japanese Buddhist Practice" (PDF), Japanese Journal of Religious Studies: 311–356, archived (PDF) from the original on 2 February 2020
- Riggs, D.E. (2007), "The Buddhist Robe According to the Teaching: Nyohōe, Nōe and Funzōe", 佛教文化研究所紀要 [Institute of Buddhist Culture, Ryukoku University], 46: A87–A97, archived from the original on 17 February 2020
- Sanvido, Marta (2017), "Multiple Layers of Transmission: Gasan Jōseki and the Goi Doctrine in the Medieval Sōtō school" (PDF), Annali di Ca' Foscari. Serie Orientale, 53, doi:10.14277/2385-3042/AnnOr-53-17-12, ISSN 2385-3042, archived (PDF) from the original on 16 November 2019
- Silk, J.A. (2003), "Dressed for Success: The Monk Kāśyapa and Strategies of Legitimation in Earlier Mahāyāna Buddhist Scriptures" (PDF), Journal asiatique, 291 (1–2): 173–219, doi:10.2143/JA.291.1.504707, archived (PDF) from the original on 17 February 2020
- Strong, J.S. (1994), The Legend and Cult of Upagupta: Sanskrit Buddhism in North India and Southeast Asia, Motilal Banarsidass Publishers, ISBN 9788120811546
- Strong, J.S. (2001), The Buddha: A Beginner's Guide, Oneworld Publications, ISBN 978-1-78074-054-6
- Strong, J.S. (2007), Relics of the Buddha, Princeton University Press, ISBN 978-0-691-11764-5
- Swearer, D.K. (2010), The Buddhist World of Southeast Asia (2nd ed.), State University of New York Press, ISBN 978-1-4384-3251-9
- Sujato, Bhikkhu; Brahmali, Bhikkhu (2015), "Authenticity of the Early Buddhist Texts" (PDF), Journal of the Oxford Centre for Buddhist Studies, 5, archived (PDF) from the original on 24 December 2015
- Tambiah, S.J. (1984), The Buddhist Saints of the Forest and the Cult of Amulets: A Study in Charisma, Hagiography, Sectarianism, and Millennial Buddhism, Cambridge University Press, ISBN 978-0-521-27787-7
- Tarrant County College, Center for Distance Learning, Great Religions of the World (PDF), archived from the original (PDF) on 14 June 2007
- Tilakaratne, A. (2003), "The Role of the Sangha in the Conflict in Sri Lanka" (PDF), Journal of Buddhist Ethics, 10: 167–191, archived (PDF) from the original on 5 August 2019
- Tournier, V. (2013), "Matériaux pour une histoire de la légende et du culte de Mahākāśyapa: une relecture d'un fragment inscrit retrouvé à Silao (Bihār)" [Materials for a History of the Legend and Cult of Mahākāśyapa: A Rereading of an Inscribed Fragment Found at Silao (Bihār)], in Ducœur, G. (ed.), Autour de Bāmiyān. De la Bactriane hellénisée à l'Inde bouddhique [Around Bāmiyān: From Hellenized Bactria to Buddhist India] (PDF) (in French), De Boccard, OCLC 823280495, archived (PDF) from the original on 19 June 2019
- Tournier, V. (2014), "Mahākāśyapa, His Lineage, and the Wish for Buddhahood: Reading Anew the Bodhgayā Inscriptions of Mahānāman" (PDF), Indo-Iranian Journal, 57 (1–2): 1–60, doi:10.1163/15728536-05701001, archived (PDF) from the original on 21 September 2017
- Tsukamoto, K. (1963), "Mahākaśyapa's Precedence to Ānanda in the Rājagṛha Council", Indogaku Bukkyogaku Kenkyu [Journal of Indian and Buddhist Studies], 11 (2): 824–817, doi:10.4259/ibk.11.824, archived from the original on 21 September 2018
- Voros, Sebastjan (January 2014), "Mahakashyapa's Smile: Language, Silence, and Mysticism", Synthesis Philosophica, 58 (2): 387–402, archived from the original on 17 February 2020
- Welter, A. (2000), "Mahākāśyapa's Smile: Silent Transmission and the Kung-an (Kōan) Tradition", in Heine, S.; Wright, D.S. (eds.), The Kōan: Texts and Contexts in Zen Buddhism, Oxford University Press, pp. 75–109, ISBN 978-0-19-802780-5
- Welter, A. (2004), "Lineage", in Buswell, Robert E. (ed.), Encyclopedia of Buddhism, vol. 2, Macmillan Reference USA, Thomson Gale, pp. 462–463, ISBN 978-0-02-865718-9
- Wilson, L. (2003), "Beggars Can Be Choosers: Mahākassapa as a Selective Eater of Offerings", in Holt, J.; Kinnard, J.N.; Walters, J.S. (eds.), Constituting Communities, Theravāda Buddhism and the Religious Cultures of South and Southeast Asia, State University of New York Press, pp. 57–70, ISBN 978-0-7914-8705-1
- Witanachchi, C. (1965), "Ānanda (6)" (PDF), in Malalasekera, G. P.; Weeraratne, W. G. (eds.), Encyclopaedia of Buddhism, vol. 1, Government of Sri Lanka, pp. 529 ff., OCLC 2863845613
- Zurcher, Erik (2005), "Buddhist Influence on Early Taoism", in Williams, Paul (ed.), Buddhism: Critical Concepts in Religious Studies, 8: Buddhism in China, East Asia, and Japan, Routledge, p. 378, ISBN 0-415-33234-6

Buddhist titles
| Preceded by Śākyamuni; Beginning of the lineage | Lineage of Buddhist patriarchs (According to the Zen schools of China and Japan) | Succeeded by Ananda |
