= Will Johnston =

American historian (born 1936)

- Born: William Murray Johnston; 1936 (age 89–90); Boston, Massachusetts, U.S.
- Other name: William M. Johnston
- Education: Harvard University (AB, PhD)
- Occupation: Historian

William Murray Johnston (born 1936), known as Will Johnston, is an American historian whose field is European intellectual history. He publishes his work under the name of William M. Johnston, partially in close collaboration with translators. Since retiring from the University of Massachusetts, in 1999, he has been a professor emeritus and now lives in Australia.

== Life ==
Johnston, born in Boston, was educated at Harvard College, where he graduated A. B. in 1958, and later took a Ph.D. at Harvard in 1965, supervised by Crane Brinton. He established his interest in European intellectual history with such works as The Formative Years of R. G. Collingwood (1965) and The Austrian Mind: An Intellectual and Social History, 1848-1938 (1972). Before publication this had received the Austrian History Prize for best manuscript in Austrian history. At the University of Massachusetts he was the dissertation supervisor of Roderick Stackelberg, two years his junior.

Johnston retired from his university's history department in 1999 with the title of Professor Emeritus, shortly before completing his two-volume Encyclopedia of Monasticism (2000). He later migrated to Australia.

== Major publications ==
- The Formative Years of R. G. Collingwood (Harvard University Archives, 1965)
- The Austrian Mind: an Intellectual and Social History, 1848-1938 (Berkeley: University of California Press, 1972)
- Vienna, Vienna: the Golden Age, 1815-1914 (1981)
- In Search of Italy: Foreign Writers in Northern Italy since 1800 (1987)
- Celebrations: the Cult of Anniversaries in Europe and the United States Today (1991)
- Recent Reference Books in Religion: a guide for students (1996)
- Encyclopedia of Monasticism, two volumes (Chicago and London: Fitzroy Dearborn, 2000)
- Zur Kulturgeschichte Österreichs und Ungarns 1890-1938, translated by Otmar Binder (Vienna, Cologne, Graz, 2015)
