= Jonathan Silk =

American academic (born 1960)

Jonathan Alan Silk (born 1960) is an American academic specialising in Buddhism. Since 2007, he has been Professor of Buddhist Studies at Leiden University.

== Career ==
Born in 1960, Silk studied at Oberlin College (BA 1983) and then spent five years studying with a Foreign Language and Area Studies Fellowship. He then attended the University of Michigan (MA 1988), where he completed doctoral studies; in 1989, he received a one-year Fulbright Doctoral Dissertation Fellowship, and then received fellowships to study Buddhism in Japan between 1991 and 1993. Michigan awarded him a PhD in 1994 for his thesis "The Origins and Early History of the Mahāratnakūţa Tradition of Mahāyāna Buddhism, with a Study of the Ratnarāśisūtra and Related Materials".

From 1994 to 1995, Silk was an assistant professor of religious studies at Grinnell College; in 1995, he moved to the Department of Comparative Religion in Western the University of Michigan. He was then an assistant professor at Yale University between 1998 and 2002, when he moved to the Department of Asian Languages and Cultures at the University of California, Los Angeles. In 2007, he moved to Leiden University to take up the chair in Buddhist studies. Since 2008, he has been co-chair of the editorial board of the journal Indo-Iranian Studies.

In 2016, Silk was elected a member of the Royal Netherlands Academy of Arts and Sciences, the national academy for science and literature in the Netherlands.

== Publications ==
- The Heart Sutra in Tibetan: A Critical Edition of the Two Recensions Contained in the Kanjur (Vienna: Arbeitskreis für Tibetische und Buddhistische Studien, Universität Wien, 1994).
- (Co-editor with L. O. Gomez) Studies in the Literature of the Great Vehicle: Three Mahāyāna Buddhist Texts (Ann Arbor: Collegiate Institute for the Study of Buddhist Literature and Center for South and Southeast Asian Studies, The University of Michigan, 1989).
- Wisdom, Compassion, and the Search for Understanding: The Buddhist Studies Legacy of Gadjin M. Nagao (Honolulu: University of Hawai‘i Press, 2000).
- Body Language: Indic Śarīra and Chinese shèlì in the Mahāparinirvāṇa-sūtra and Saddharma-puṇḍarīka (Tokyo: The International Institute for Buddhist Studies, 2006).
- Managing Monks: Administrators and Administrative Roles in Indian Buddhist Monasticism (New York: Oxford University Press, 2008).
- Forbidden Women: A Peculiar Buddhist Reference (Turnhout: Brepols, 2008).
- Riven by Lust: Incest and Schism in Indian Buddhist Legend and Historiography (Honolulu: University of Hawai‘i Press, 2009).
- (Editor) Buddhism in China: Collected Papers of Erik Zürcher (Leiden: Brill, 2013).
- Buddhist Cosmic Unity: An Edition, Translation and Study of the Anūnatvāpūrṇatvanirdeśa–parivarta, Hamburg Buddhist Studies, no. 4 (Hamburg: Hamburg University Press, 2015).
- (Editor) Brill’s Encyclopedia of Buddhism, vol. 1 (Leiden: Brill, 2015).
- Materials Toward the Study of Vasubandhu’s Viṁśikā (I): Sanskrit and Tibetan Critical Editions of the Verses and Autocommentary; An English Translation and Annotations, Harvard Oriental Series, no. 81 (Cambridge, MA: Department of South Asian Studies, Harvard University, 2016).
