= Ivan Minayev =

Russian Indologist (1840-1890)

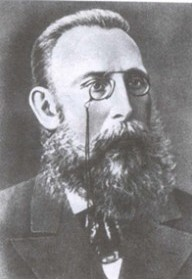
I. P. Minaev

Ivan Pavlovich Minayev or Minayeff (Иван Павлович Минаев; 21 October 1840 – 13 June 1890) was the first Russian Indologist whose disciples included Serge Oldenburg, F. Th. Stcherbatsky, and Dmitry Kudryavsky.

As a student of Vasily Vasiliev at the University of Saint Petersburg he developed an interest in Pali literature and went abroad to prepare a catalogue of Pali manuscripts at the British Museum and the Bibliothèque Nationale (still unpublished). His Russian-language Pali grammar (1872) was soon translated into French (1874) and English (1882).

Minayev's magnum opus, Buddhism: Untersuchungen und Materialien, was printed in 1887. "Minaev was almost the first European orientalist... to feel that the study of Buddhism and Pali was a must for the proper understanding of ancient Indian history and society".

As a member of the Russian Geographical Society he travelled in India and Burma and Nepal in 1874–75, 1880, and 1885–86. His travel journals were published in English in 1958 and 1970.
