= Śāriputra =

Prominent and leading disciple of the Buddha

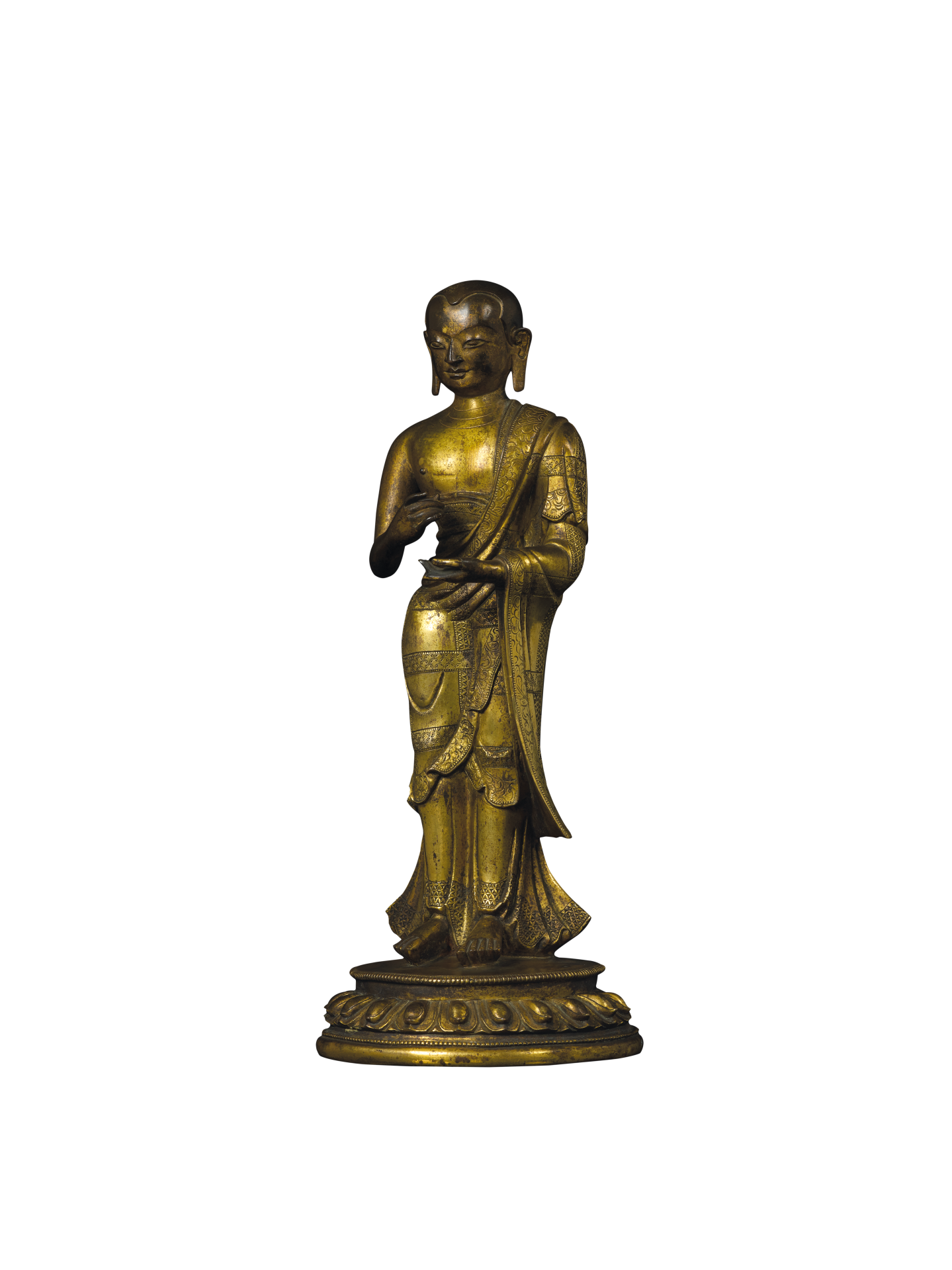
- Statue of Śāriputra from 17th century Qing China
- Title: Dhammasenapati (Marshal of the Dharma); Paṭhamasāvaka (First Chief disciple); Dakkhinasāvaka (Right hand side Chief disciple)

Personal life
- Born: Upatiṣya (Pali: Upatissa) c. 6th/5th century BCE Nālaka or Upatiṣya Village, Rajgir, Magadha
- Died: c. 6th/5th century BCE Nālaka or Upatiṣya Village, Rajgir, Magadha
- Parent(s): Vaṇganta or Tisya (father), Sāri (mother)

Religious life
- Religion: Buddhism
- School: all
- Dharma name: Śāriputra

Senior posting
- Teacher: Gautama Buddha

Translations of Śāriputra
- Sanskrit: शारिपुत्र; Śāriputra
- Pali: Sāriputta
- Burmese: ရှင်သာရိပုတ္တရာ (Shin Sāriputtarā) (MLCTS: ʃɪ̀ɴθàɹḭpoʊʔtəɹà)
- Chinese: 舎利弗; 舎利子 (Pinyin: Shèlìfú; Shèlìzi)
- Japanese: 舎利弗(しゃりほつ); 舎利子(しゃりし) (Rōmaji: Sharihotsu; Sharishi)
- Khmer: សារីបុត្រ (UNGEGN: sareibŏt)
- Korean: 사리불; 사리자 (RR: Saribul; Sarija)
- Sinhala: ශාරිපුත්‍ර (śāriputra) සැරියුත් (særiyut)
- Tagalog: Sariputra
- Tibetan: ཤཱ་རིའི་བུ་ (Wylie: shA ri'i bu) (THL: sha ri bu)
- Thai: สารีบุตร (RTGS: Saribut)
- Vietnamese: Xá Lợi Phất; Xá Lợi Tử

Śāriputra (Sanskrit: शारिपुत्र; Tibetan: ཤཱ་རིའི་བུ་, Pali: Sāriputta, lit. "the son of Śāri", born Upatiṣya, Pali: Upatissa) was one of the top disciples of the Buddha. He is considered the first of the Buddha's two chief male disciples, together with Maudgalyāyana (Pali: Moggallāna). Śāriputra had a key leadership role in the ministry of the Buddha and is considered in many Buddhist schools to have been important in the development of the Buddhist Abhidharma. He frequently appears in Mahayana sutras, and in some sutras, is used as a counterpoint to represent the Hinayana school of Buddhism.

Historians believe Śāriputra was born in the ancient Indian kingdom of Magadha around the 6th or 5th century BCE. Buddhist texts relate that Śāriputra and Maudgalyāyana were childhood friends who became spiritual wanderers in their youth. After having searched for spiritual truth with other contemporary teachers, they came into contact with the teachings of the Buddha and ordained as monks under him, after which the Buddha declared the friends his two chief disciples. Śāriputra was said to have attained enlightenment as an arhat two weeks after ordination. As chief disciple Śāriputra assumed a leadership role in the Sangha, doing tasks like looking after monks, assigning them objects of meditation, and clarifying points of doctrine. He was the first disciple the Buddha allowed to ordain other monks. Śāriputra died shortly before the Buddha in his hometown and was cremated. According to Buddhist texts, his relics were then enshrined at Jetavana Monastery. Archaeological findings from the 1800s suggest his relics may have been redistributed across the Indian subcontinent by subsequent kings.

Śāriputra is regarded as an important and wise disciple of the Buddha, particularly in Theravada Buddhism where he is given a status close to a second Buddha. In Buddhist art, he is often depicted alongside the Buddha, usually to his right. Śāriputra was known for his strict adherence to the Buddhist monastic rules, as well as for his wisdom and teaching ability, giving him the title "General of the Dharma" (Sanskrit: Dharmasenāpati; Pali: Dhammasenāpati). Śāriputra is considered the disciple of the Buddha who was foremost in wisdom. His female counterpart was Kṣemā (Pali: Khemā).

== Background ==
According to Buddhist texts, when a fully enlightened Buddha appears in the world, he always has a set of chief disciples. For the current Buddha, Gautama, his chief male disciples were Śāriputra and Maudgalyāyana, while his chief female disciples were Khema and Uppalavanna. According to the Buddhavaṃsa, all Buddhas of the past followed this pattern of selecting two chief male disciples and two chief female disciples. German Buddhist scholar and monk Nyanaponika Thera states that the reason Buddhas always select two chief disciples is to balance responsibilities according to each disciple's specific skills.

According to the Pāli Canon, in the distant past Śāriputra was born a wealthy person named Sarada who gave away his wealth to become an ascetic who developed a large following. At that time, Sarada and his followers were visited by the past Buddha, Anomadassi Buddha, and were given a sermon by Anomadassī Buddha and his chief disciples. Upon hearing the sermon from Anomadassī Buddha's first chief disciple Nisabha, Sarada became inspired and resolved to become the first chief disciple of a future Buddha. He then made this wish in front of Anomadassī Buddha, who looked into the future and then declared that his aspiration would come true. Upon hearing the prediction, Sarada went to his close friend Sirivaddhana and asked him to resolve to become the second chief disciple of the same Buddha. Sirivaddhana then made a large offering to Anomadassī Buddha and his following, making the wish as suggested. Anomadassī Buddha looked into the future and declared that Sirivaddhana's aspiration would also come true. The two friends then spent the rest of their lives and many future lives doing good deeds. According to Buddhist legend, the aspiration came true in the time of Gautama Buddha with Sarada being reborn as Śāriputra and Sirivaddhana as Maudgalyāyana.

== Biography ==
=== Early life ===
Buddhist texts describe that Śāriputra was born with the birth name Upatiṣya (Pali: Upatissa) to a wealthy family in a village near Rājagaha in the ancient Indian kingdom of Magadha. Texts from the Mūlasarvāstivāda tradition state he was named after his father, while the Pali commentaries of the Theravada tradition state he was named after his birth village. (Note: Some Pali texts contradict this however and state his birth village as Nālaka, although this may be an alternative name for Upatissa.) Chinese Buddhist pilgrim Faxian refers to Śāriputra's birth village as Nāla (Nālaka) while Chinese pilgrim Xuanzang refers to the village as Kālapināka. The village has been variously identified as being either modern-day Sarichak, Chandiman (Chandimau), or Nanan (considered most likely to be the correct location).

Upatiṣya is described as having had a "golden complexion". He had six siblings; three brothers named Upasena, Cunda and Revata, and three sisters named Cāla, Upacālā and Sīsupacālā. Each of his siblings would grow up to become arhat disciples of the Buddha. According to the Pali tradition, Upatiṣya's father was named Vangunta, while according to Mūlasarvāstivāda tradition his father was named Tiṣya (Pali: Tissa). Upatiṣya's mother was named Śārī (alternatively called Rūpaśārī, Śārika, or Śāradvatī), because she had eyes like a śārika bird. His mother was the reason Upatiṣya later became known as Śāriputra (son of Śāri) and sometimes Śāradvatīputra (son of Śāradvatī).

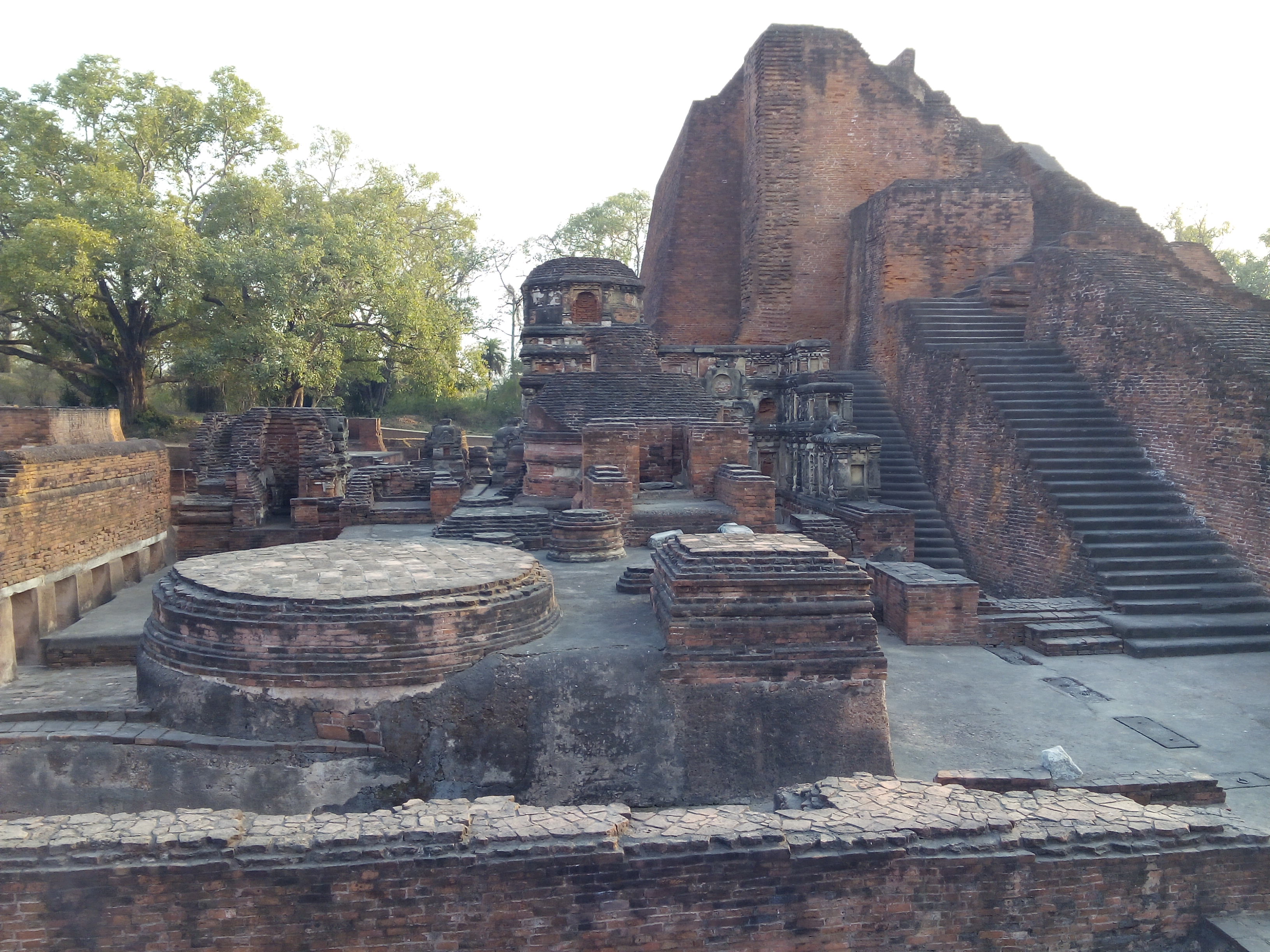
A stupa dedicated to Śāriputra at the ancient Nalanda monastery. Nyanaponika Thera states that Nalanda was probably close to where Śāriputra was born and died.

Upatiṣya was born the same day as Kolita (who would later be known as Maudgalyāyana), a boy from a neighboring village whose family had been friends with Upatiṣya's family for seven generations, and became friends with him as a child. Upatiṣya and Kolita both became masters of the Vedas through their education and each developed a large following of youths. One day the realization that life is impermanent overtook the two friends during a festival in Rājagaha and they developed a sense of spiritual urgency.

Realizing the pointlessness of the impermanent material world, the two friends set out as ascetics to search for an end to rebirth. In Mūlasarvāstivāda texts, the two friends visited all six major teachers of India at the time before realizing none of them had the right path. According to Pali texts, the two friends and their following of youths became students under only one of the teachers, the ascetic Sañjaya Vairatiputra (Pali: Sañjaya Belaṭṭhaputta), who was staying nearby. Pali texts describe Sañjaya as a teacher in the Indian Sceptic tradition, with Upatiṣya and Kolita eventually becoming dissatisfied with his teachings and leaving. In Mūlasarvāstivāda texts, the Chinese Buddhist Canon and in Tibetan accounts, however, he is depicted as a wise teacher with meditative vision who becomes ill and dies. In some accounts, he predicts the coming of the Buddha through his visions. After being unable to find what they were looking for, the two friends went their separate ways but made a pact that if one was to find the path to Nirvana, he would tell the other.

=== Meeting the Buddha ===
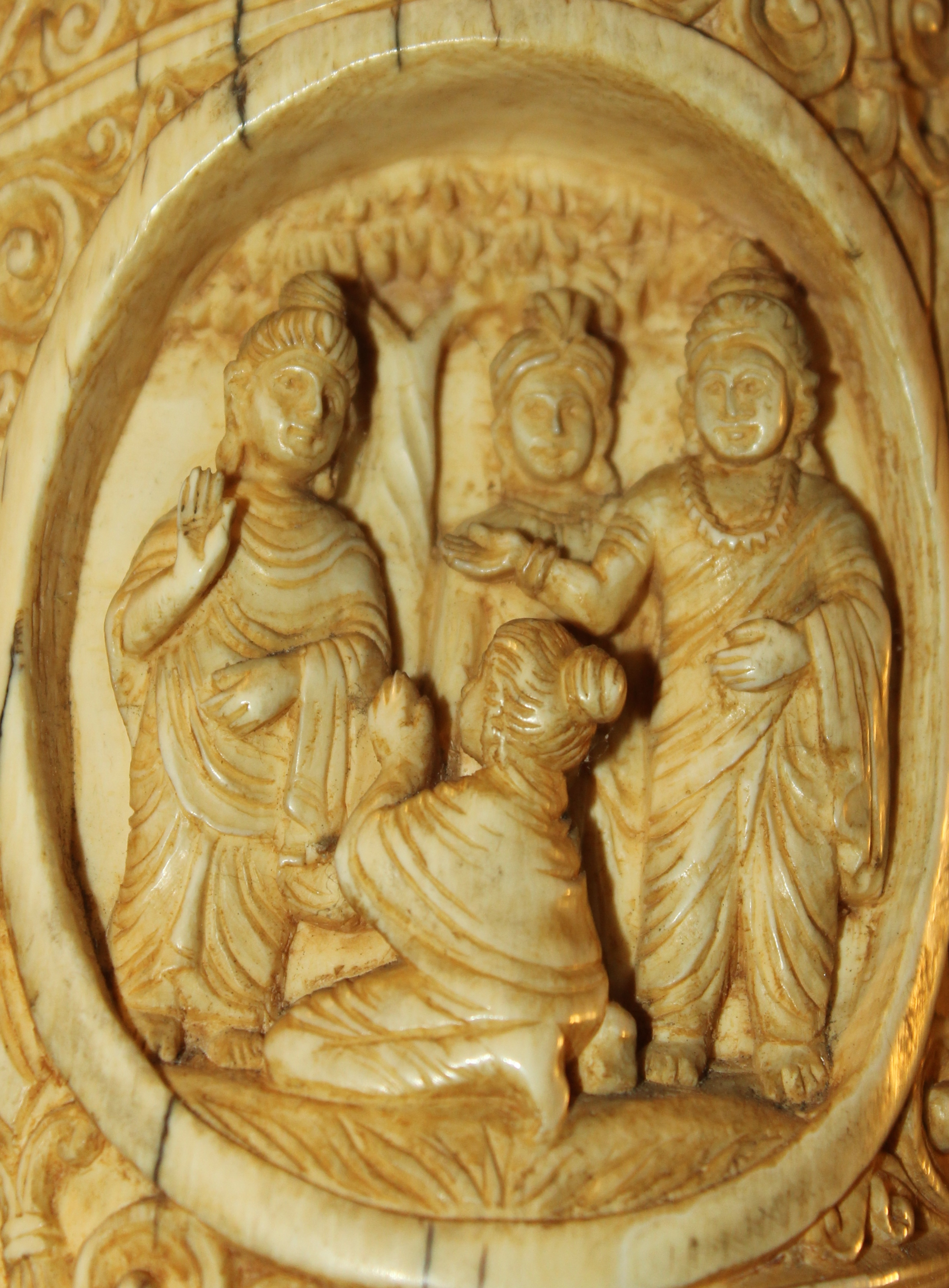
Ivory relief depicting Śāriputra and Maudgalyāyana becoming disciples of the Buddha

After leaving Sañjaya, Upatiṣya encountered the monk Aśvajit (Pali: Assaji), one of the Buddha's first five arhat disciples. Upatiṣya noticed how serene the monk appeared and approached him to ask for a teaching. Aśvajit said he was still newly ordained but would teach what he can, and proceeded to teach the famous Ye Dharma Hetu stanza:

Of all those things that from a cause arise,

Tathagata the cause thereof has told;

And how they cease to be, that too he tells,

This is the doctrine of the Great Recluse.

— Translated by Nyanaponika Thera

This stanza has become particularly famous in the Buddhist world, having been inscribed onto many Buddhist statues. According to philosopher Paul Carus, the stanza breaks away from the idea of divine intervention prevalent in ancient Brahmanism at the time and instead teaches that the origin and end of all things depends on its causation.

Following the teaching, Upatiṣya attained sotapanna, the first stage of enlightenment. Upatiṣya then went to Kolita to tell him about the incident and, after reciting the stanza for him, Kolita also attained sotapanna. (Note: In one version of the Chinese Buddhist canon, Śāriputra first went to the Buddha alone after being converted by Aśvajit, and then asked the Buddha for permission to go find his friend.) The two friends, along with a large chunk of Sañjaya's disciples, then ordained as monks under the Buddha, with everybody in the group becoming arhats that day except for Upatiṣya and Kolita. Nyanaponika Thera states that the friends required longer preparatory periods before enlightening in order to fulfill their roles as chief disciples. Several texts describe the ordination with miraculous elements, such as the disciples' clothes suddenly being replaced with Buddhist robes and their hair falling out on its own. After ordaining, Upatiṣya started being called Śāriputra (Pali: Sāriputta), and Kolita started being called Maudgalyāyana (Pali: Moggallāna).

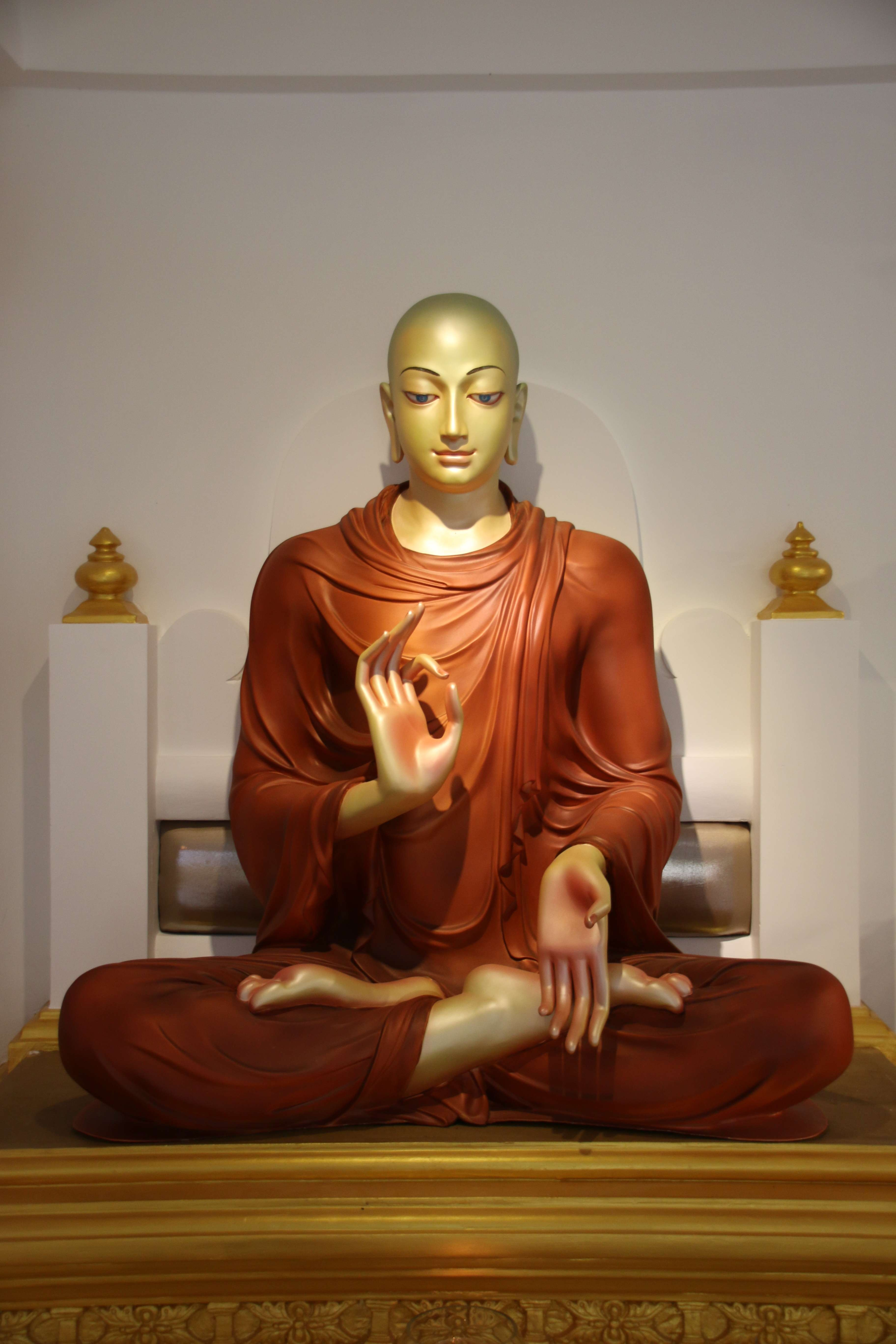
Statue of Sariputra from Mahamevnawa Buddhist Monastery, Sri Lanka

After Śāriputra and Maudgalyāyana ordained, the Buddha declared them his two chief disciples (Pali: aggasavaka), following the tradition of appointing a pair of chief disciples as the past Buddhas did, according to Buddhist belief. Since they were newly ordained some of the monks in the assembly felt offended, but the Buddha explained that he gave them the roles because they had made the resolve to become the chief disciples many lifetimes ago. Maudgalyāyana attained arhatship seven days after ordaining following intense meditation training. Śāriputra attained arhatship two weeks after ordaining while fanning the Buddha as the Buddha was delivering the Vedanāpariggaha Sutta to a wandering ascetic. Pali texts state that the ascetic was Śāriputra's nephew but Chinese, Tibetan and Sanskrit texts state he was Śāriputra's uncle. According to commentaries such as the Atthakatha, Śāriputra took longer to achieve enlightenment than Maudgalyāyana because his knowledge had to be more thorough as first chief disciple, and thus required more preparation time.

=== Chief disciple ===
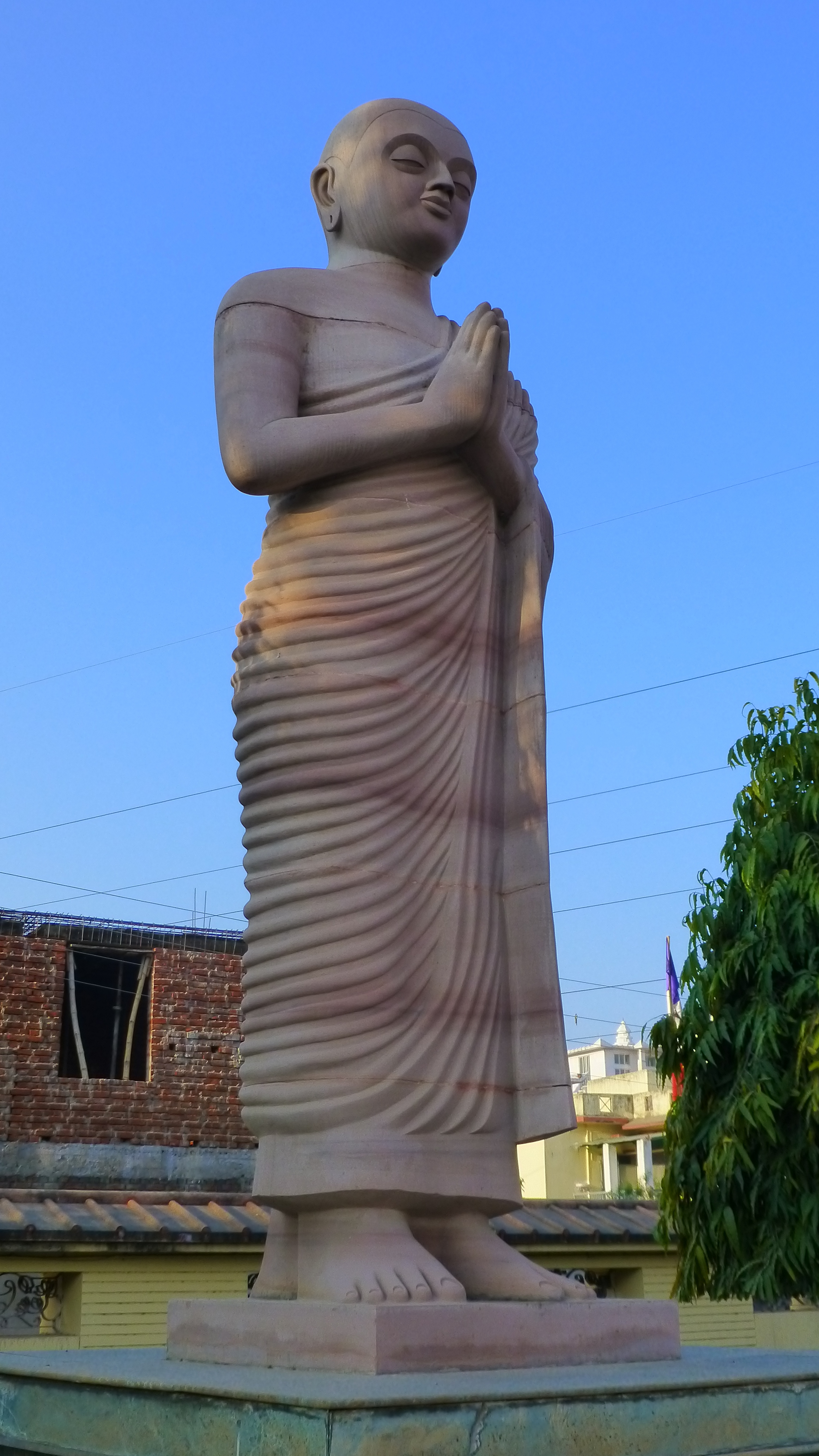
A statue of Śāriputra at Bodh Gaya.

Śāriputra is considered to have been the Buddha's first chief disciple, foremost in wisdom, a title he shared with the nun Kṣemā (Pali: Khemā). He shared the title of chief male disciple with Maudgalyāyana, together described in the Mahāpadāna Sutta as "the chief pair of disciples, the excellent pair" (Pali: sāvakayugaṁ aggaṁ bhaddayugaṁ). In the Mahavagga, the Buddha declared his two chief male disciples as being foremost in wisdom and foremost in psychic powers, referencing Śāriputra and Maudgalyāyana respectively. Texts describe that none of the Buddha's other disciples could answer questions that Maudgalyāyana was able to answer while Maudgalyāyana was unable to answer questions Śāriputra was able to answer. Buddhist tradition maintains that the first chief disciple, Śāriputra, customarily sat to the Buddha's right hand side, while the second chief disciple, Maudgalyāyana, sat to the left. The disciples have thus been stylized as the right hand and left hand disciples of the Buddha in Buddhist tradition and art accordingly.

As the first chief disciple, Śāriputra's role was the systematization and analysis of the Buddha's teachings. The Buddhist canon often shows Śāriputra asking the Buddha questions and entreating the Buddha to teach, as well as himself clarifying points and questioning disciples, in some cases seemingly to test the knowledge of fellow disciples. The Buddha would often suggest a topic and have Śāriputra elaborate and deliver a sermon on it. In two discourses recorded in the Tripitaka, the Dasuttara Sutta and the Saṅgīti Sutta, the Buddha declared he needed to rest his back, and had Śāriputra teach in his place while the Buddha listened in the audience. His ability to teach the Dharma earned him the title of "General of the Dharma" (Sanskrit: Dharmasenapati). Buddhist texts indicate that Śāriputra still had some flaws, however. In the Catuma Sutta, when a group of young monks made noise and were ordered by the Buddha to leave, the Buddha reprimanded Śāriputra for not concluding that it was the chief disciples' responsibility to look after the monks, something Maudgalyāyana was able to conclude. On another occasion the Buddha reprimanded Śāriputra for teaching the dying Dhanañjani, in a way that led him to rebirth in the Brahma realm rather than teaching in a way that led to enlightenment.

Śāriputra assumed a leadership role in the Buddha's monastic community, or Sangha. Buddhist texts describe that Śāriputra routinely took charge of monastic affairs usually handled by the Buddha himself, such as attending to sick monks or visiting lay followers before their deaths. In one instance, when a group of monks planned to travel elsewhere, the Buddha told them to ask Śāriputra for permission first. Śāriputra was the first disciple of the Buddha who was asked to ordain monks in his place, with the Buddha giving him the ordination procedure. He was also entrusted to ordain the Buddha's son Rahula. When Śāriputra trained pupils, he gave them material and spiritual help, and assigned them an object of meditation. In the Saccavibhanga Sutta, the Buddha compared Śāriputra to a mother who gives birth to a child while comparing Maudgalyāyana to a nurse who raises a child. Śāriputra would train students to sotapanna, the first stage of enlightenment, and Maudgalyāyana would train students to arhatship, the highest stage of enlightenment. (Note: American scholar monk Thanissaro Bhikkhu notes that it may seem strange Śāriputra had what appears to have been a lower job than Maudgalyāyana, but states it is actually harder to train an unenlightened person to become a sotapanna than to train a sotapanna to become an arhat.) However, Nyanaponika Thera notes that there are several individual cases where Śāriputra guided monks to the higher stages of enlightenment as well.

=== Person ===
Buddhist texts portray Śāriputra as someone who took an active role in debating and converting heretics, considered to have been one of his great prerogatives. In the Mūlasarvāstivāda tradition, when the six heretical teachers of the time challenged the Buddhists to a contest, the Buddha had Śāriputra contend against them. Mūlasarvāstivāda texts state that Śāriputra used psychic powers to create a huge storm and transform himself into various forms, subduing the rival teachers and converting the residents of Savatthi. When the monk Devadatta created a schism in the Buddha's monastic community and led some of the Buddha's disciples away, Śāriputra played a key role in restoring the community. According to texts, upon hearing about the schism, Śāriputra and Maudgalyāyana pretended to join Devadatta's community. After the chief disciples joined, Devadatta claimed to have had a backache and had Śāriputra preach in his place, but Devadatta fell asleep and Śāriputra and Maudgalyāyana used the opportunity to get the following to return to the Buddha.

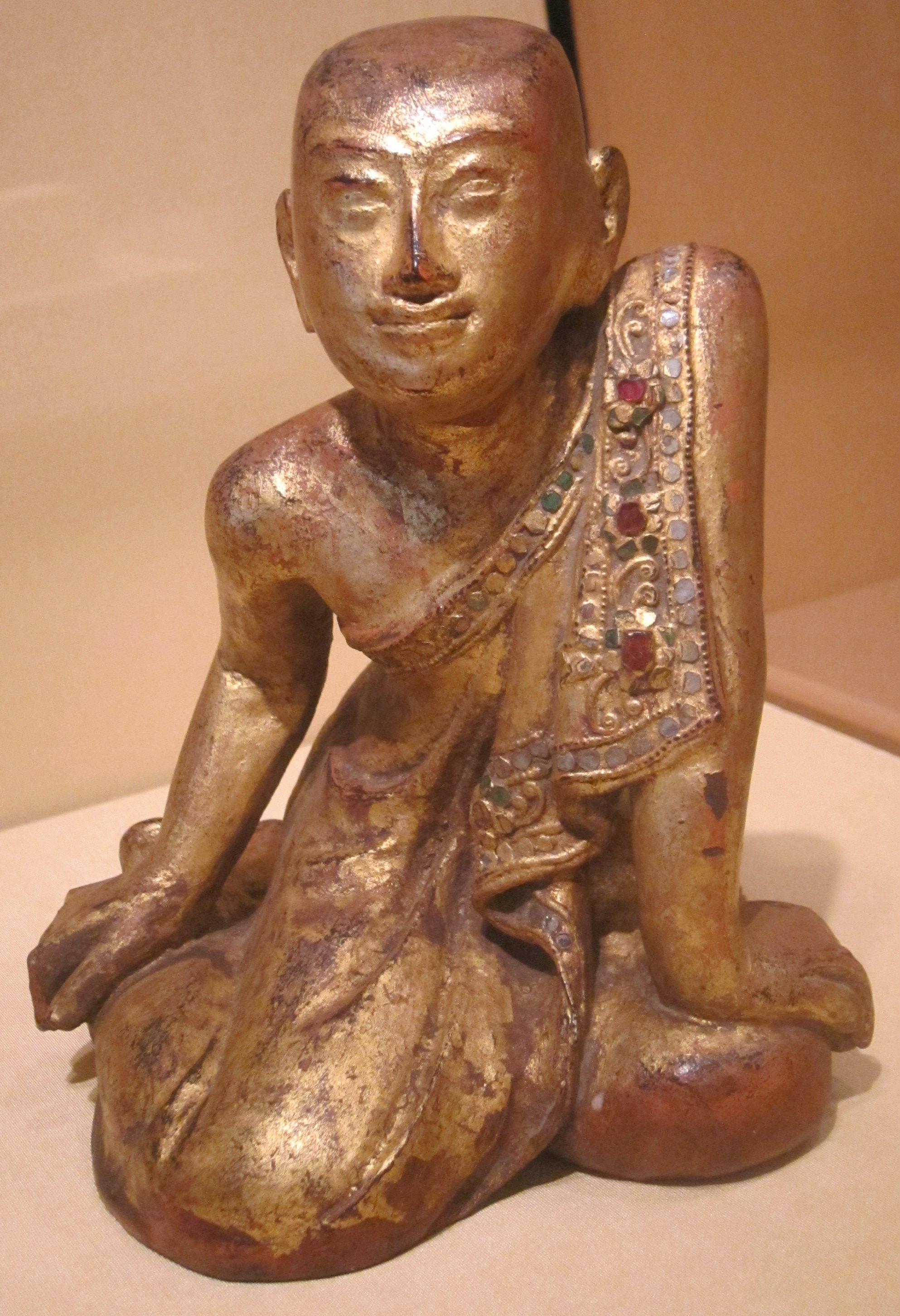
Gilded statue of Śāriputra from Burma.

Buddhist texts generally credit the establishment of the monastic rules to Śāriputra, with Śāriputra being the one to ask the Buddha to create the rules. When Śāriputra asked the Buddha, he said he would lay them down at the right time. Śāriputra was known for his conscientiousness and meticulous adherence to monastic rules. In one story, Śāriputra became ill with an ailment that could be treated with garlic, but refused it because the Buddha had previously laid down a rule forbidding monks to eat garlic, with Śāriputra only taking it after the Buddha rescinded the rule. In another story, Śāriputra found that meal cakes tended to make him greedy and then made a vow to abstain from them. A Buddhist commentary describes that one time when the other monks had left to collect alms, Śāriputra meticulously cleaned and organized the monastery to keep heretics from criticizing the disciples. Several Buddhist texts relate that Śāriputra was reborn as a snake in a previous life and that this was the reason for some of his stubbornness. In a Mahāsāṃghika text the Buddha punished Śāriputra by making him stand in the sun for failing to prevent some monks from making incorrect remarks. When the other monks later asked the Buddha to stop the punishment, the Buddha said that Śāriputra's decision to receive the punishment could not be changed, just as he was unwilling to change his mind when he was a snake. In a Mahīśāsaka text, Śāriputra refused to take a type of fruit, even when prescribed as medicine, after another monk suspected him of sneaking delicious food, the Buddha likewise references Śāriputra's life as a snake to explain his stubbornness.

Although Maudgalyāyana is described as having been foremost in psychic powers, Buddhist texts state that Śāriputra also exhibited such powers himself. In various texts, Śāriputra is reported to have exhibited several psychic abilities such as levitation and the ability to visit other realms of existence, as well as abilities common among arhats such as recalling past lives and clairvoyance. In one story, a yaksha, or spirit, hit Śāriputra in the head while he was meditating. When Maudgalyāyana saw the incident and came to ask Śāriputra if he was okay, Śāriputra stated he didn't even notice the blow and suffered only a minor headache. Maudgalyāyana then praised Śāriputra for his psychic abilities by being able to sustain a blow with little notice, described in the Patisambhidamagga text as an example of “the power of intervention by concentration” (Pali: samādhivipphāra-iddhi). In Mūlasarvāstivāda texts, Śāriputra and Maudgalyāyana descended to hell to give Devadatta the prophecy that he will become a pratyekabuddha in the future. During the visit, it is said that Maudgalyāyana attempted to relieve the suffering of those in hell by creating rain but the rain dispersed. After Śāriputra saw this, he created a rain that did relieve the suffering of those in hell, using a wisdom based meditation. In another Mūlasarvāstivāda text, the Buddha sent Maudgalyāyana to retrieve Śāriputra, who was doing sewing work. When Śāriputra stated he would go after his sewing work was complete, Maudgalyāyana attempted to force him to come by using his psychic powers to shake the ground but Śāriputra was unaffected. When Śāriputra told him to return first, Maudgalyāyana went back to the Buddha and found that Śāriputra had already arrived. When Maudgalyāyana saw this, he stated that the power of psychic abilities was no match for the power of wisdom.

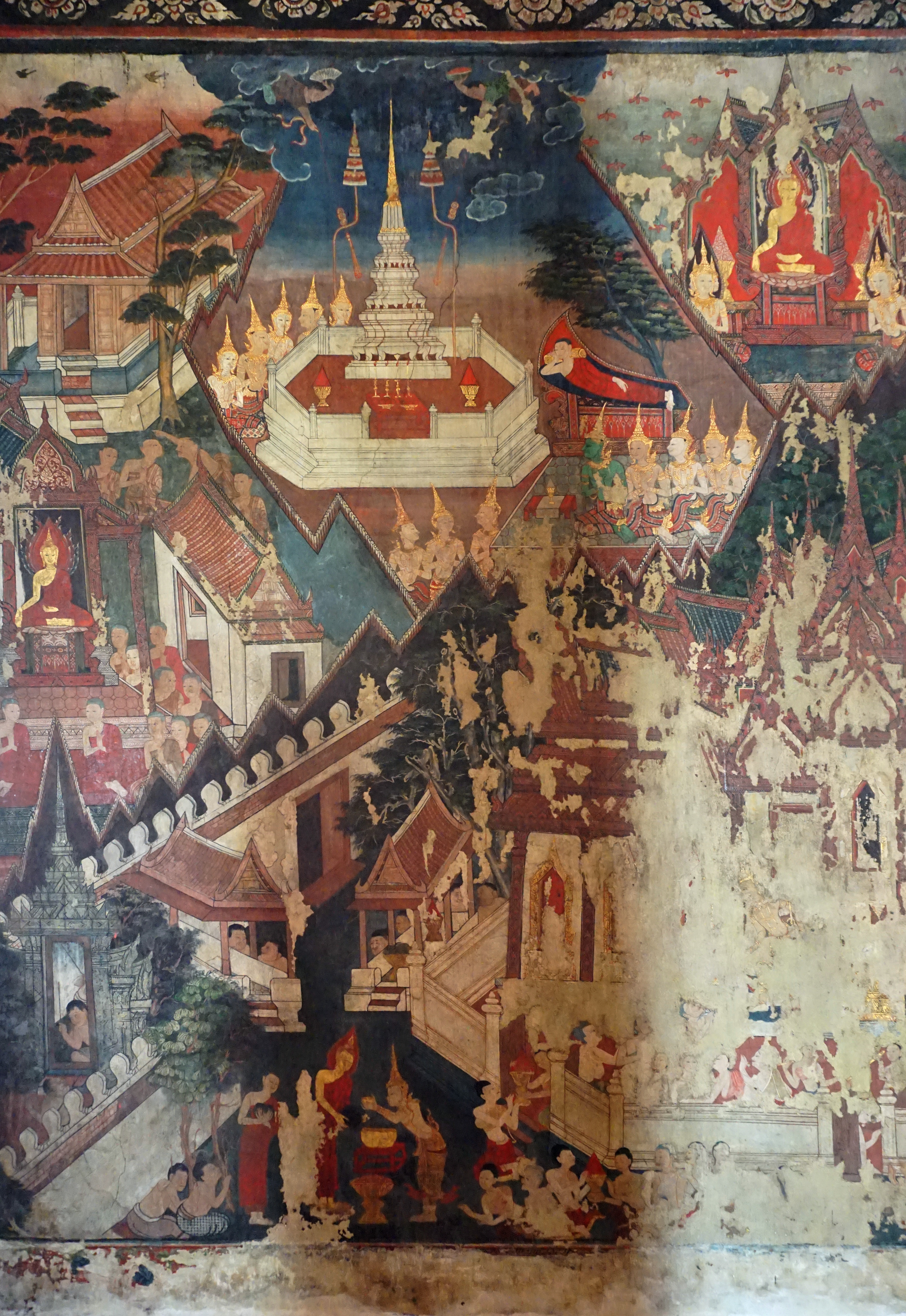
Painting depicting the death of Śāriputra at the Bangkok National Museum.

=== Death ===
Buddhist texts all state that Śāriputra died shortly before the Buddha, with texts generally indicating he died in his hometown. According to Pāli commentaries, Śāriputra arose from meditation one day and realized through his meditative insight that the chief disciples were supposed to achieve parinirvana before the Buddha, and that he had seven more days to live. Śāriputra then traveled to his hometown to teach his mother, who was yet to be converted to Buddhism. After he converted his mother, Śāriputra died peacefully on the full moon day of Kartika a few months before the Buddha. According to Mūlasarvāstivāda texts, however, it is said that Śāriputra achieved paranirvana voluntarily because he didn't want to witness the Buddha's death, in some accounts he was also motivated by Maudgalyāyana intending to achieve paranirvana after being beaten and mortally injured by a rival religious group. In the Sarvāstivāda account, Śāriputra and Maudgalyāyana both achieved paranirvana voluntarily on the same day, because they didn't want to witness the Buddha's death. In several versions of the story, various heavenly beings from Buddhist cosmology are said to have come to pay respect to Śāriputra near his time of death.

A funeral was held for Śāriputra in the city of Rajgir where his remains were cremated. His relics were then brought by Śāriputra's assistant, Cunda, to the Buddha in Śrāvastī. In the Anupada Sutta, the Buddha gave a eulogy of Śāriputra, praising his intellect and virtue. According to a Dighanikaya commentary, the Buddha enshrined Śāriputra's relics in a cetiya at Jetavana. In Mūlasarvāstivāda texts, the relics were given to the lay disciple, Anathapindika, and it is him who builds a stupa and enshrines the relics at Jetavana. (Note: This version conflicts with some texts that state that Anathapindika died first.)

== Abhidharma ==
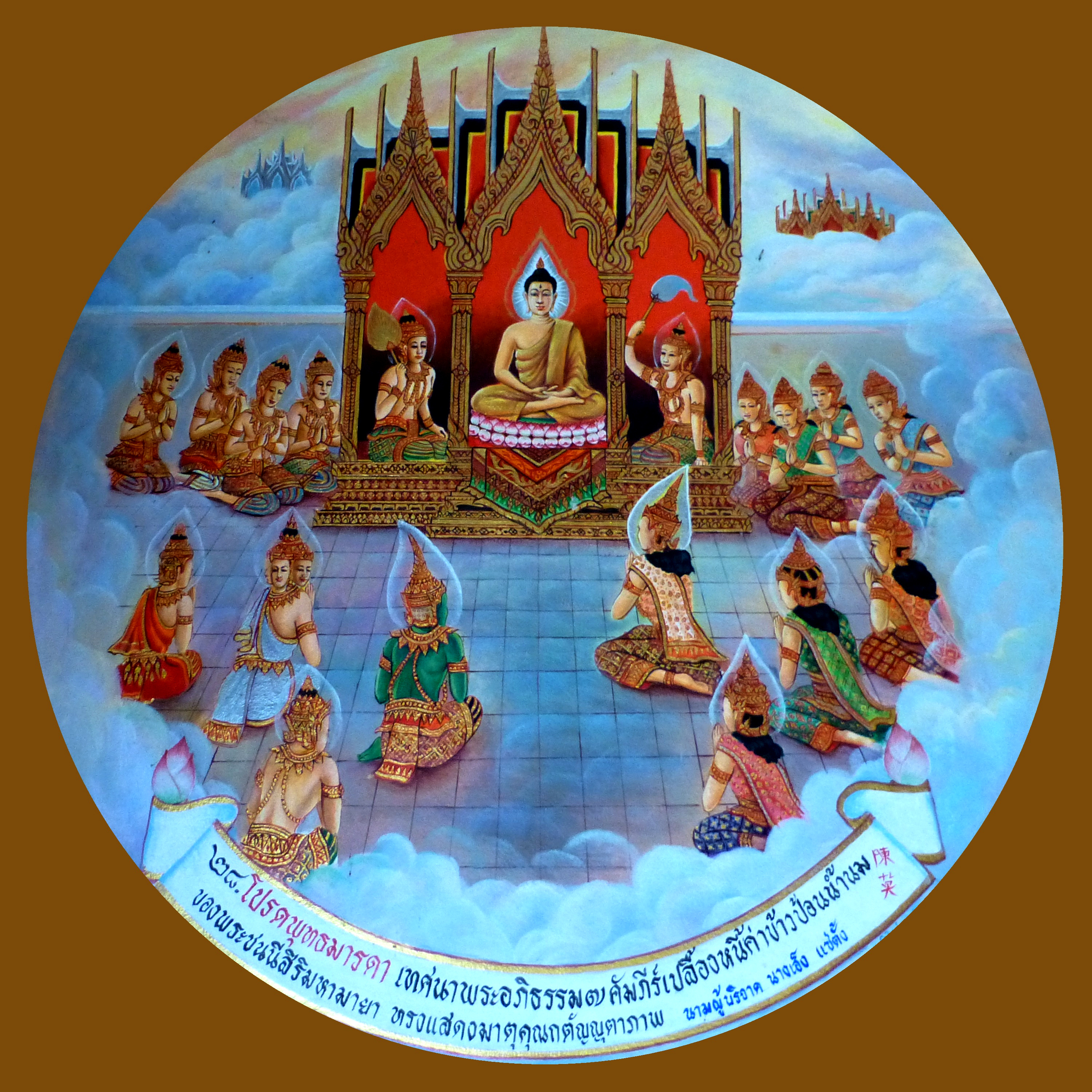
According to Theravada tradition, the Buddha taught the Abhidharma in Tavatimsa heaven and returned to earth daily to give Śāriputra a summary.

Śāriputra is said to have played a key role in the development of the Abhidharma texts of the Buddhist Tripitaka. Buddhist scholar monks Rewata Dhamma and Bhikkhu Bodhi describe the Abhidharma as "an abstract and highly technical systemization of the doctrine". According to Theravada tradition, the Abhidharma, or "Higher Dharma", is said to have been preached by the Buddha to devas while he was spending the rainy season in Tavatimsa Heaven. It is said that the Buddha returned to earth daily to give a summary to Śāriputra, who classified and reordered the teachings and relayed it to his disciples, in what would become the Abhidharma Pitaka. Various sets of the Sarvastivada school of Buddhism, however, attribute each of the seven books (Note: Some Buddhist schools classify the Abhidharma into six or eight parts, rather than seven.) of the Abhidharma to different authors, with Śāriputra being attributed as the author of just the Sangitiparyaya in the Chinese Sarvastivada tradition and as the author of the Dharmaskandha in the Sanskrit and Tibetan Sarvastivada traditions. In the Vatsiputriya tradition, a subset of the Sarvastivada school, Śāriputra is said to have transmitted the Abhidharma to Rahula, who later transmitted it to the school's founder, Vatsiputra. As the author of the Abhidharma in Buddhist tradition, Śāriputra is considered to be the patron saint of the Abhidharmists.

French religion writer André Migot, argues that the Abhidharma was formulated no earlier than the time of Emperor Asoka, and thus cannot really be attributed to the historic Śāriputra, at least not the version known by modern scholars. English historian Edward J. Thomas dates the development of the Abhidharma as being sometime between the third century BCE and the first century CE. However, Migot states that a simpler version of the Abhidharma likely existed in early Buddhism, before it evolved and was written down in its current form. Migot points to the mention of the "Matrka" Pitaka in Cullavagga texts as the precursor to the Abhidharma Pitaka. Migot argues that the Matrka Pitaka, recited by Mahākāśyapa at the First Buddhist Council according to Ashokavadana texts, likely began as a condensed version of Buddhist doctrine that developed over time with metaphysical aspects to become the Abhidharma. Thomas also states that the Abhidharma had earlier roots and was developed based on existing material, likely a method of discussing the principles of the Buddha's teachings. According to Thomas, different Buddhist schools compiled their own Abhidharma works separately, but based it on common existing material.

== In Mahayana sutras ==
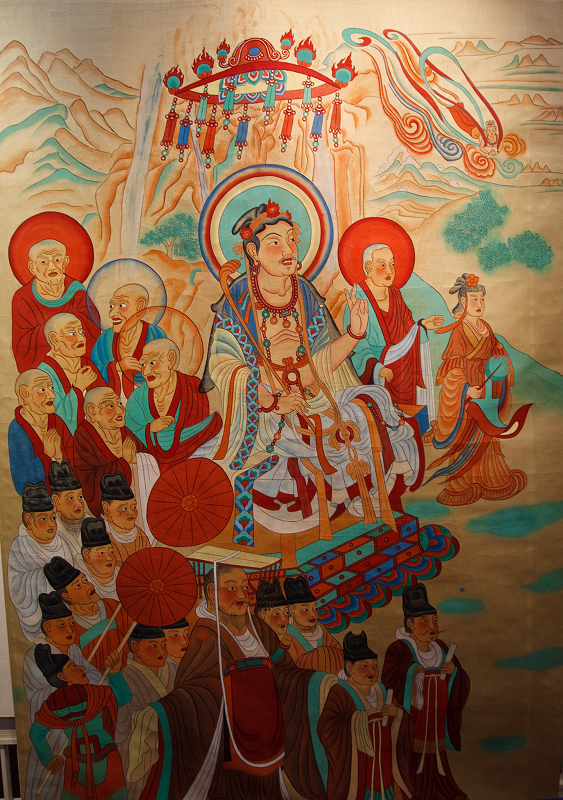
A Chinese painting depicting the events of the Vimalakīrti sutra.

Śāriputra frequently appears in Mahayana sutras, often asking the Buddha to teach or engaging in the dialogue himself. Migot states that it is significant that Śāriputra has a continuity in Mahayana texts, as most of the Buddha's great disciples are usually absent from Mahayana literature. Migot credits the importance of Śāriputra in the early Vatsiputriya Buddhist school with why Śāriputra often appeared in Mahayana texts. While depictions of Śāriputra in the Pāli Canon generally portray him as a wise and powerful arhat, second only to the Buddha, Mahayana texts give him a wider range of depictions. Some Mahayana sutras portray him as a great Buddhist disciple while others portray him as a counterpoint with insufficient understanding of Mahayana doctrine, representative of the Hinayana tradition. Buddhist studies scholar Donald S. Lopez Jr. describes the latter as "intentional irony" aimed at depicting how profound Mahayana doctrine is by showing that even the wisest "Hinayana" disciple had difficulty understanding it.

=== The Vimalakīrti Sūtra ===
In the Vimalakīrti Sūtra, Śāriputra is depicted as being unable to grasp Mahayana doctrines such as non-duality and emptiness. In the sutra, a goddess listening to Vimalakīrti scatters flowers which fall onto Śāriputra's robes. Not wanting to break the monastic rules, which forbid decorating oneself with flowers, he tries to remove them but is unable to. The goddess then accuses Śāriputra of being attached to the duality of what is proper and improper. Later in the sutra, Śāriputra asks that if the goddess is so spiritually advanced, why doesn't she transform out of her female state, indicative of cultural sexism. The goddess responds by using her powers to switch bodies with Śāriputra to demonstrate that male and female is just an illusion because, according to Mahayana doctrine, all things are empty and so male and female don't really exist.

=== Prajñāpāramitā sutras ===
In the Prajñāpāramitā sutras, Śāriputra is often depicted as the counterpoint to the true meaning of prajñāpāramitā. In the Astasahasrika Prajñāpāramitā Sutra, Śāriputra is portrayed as being unable to understand the ultimate meaning of prajñāpāramitā and instead must be instructed by the disciple Subhūti. According to Buddhist scholar Edward Conze, the sutra depicts Śāriputra as being preoccupied with dualities, making him unable to grasp the true meaning of prajnaparamita. In the Mahaprajnaparamita Sutra, Śāriputra is one of the principal interlocutors, asking questions and being instructed. Conze states that Śāriputra has to be instructed in this sutra because, despite his great wisdom, prajnaparamita doctrine was too advanced for his comprehension. The Da zhidu lun commentary to the sutra describes Śāriputra as someone who pursued the bodhisattva path in a past life but gave up and turned to the Śrāvaka path after donating his eye to a beggar who threw the eye on the ground.

Religious studies scholar Douglas Osto argues that Śāriputra is portrayed as such in Prajñāpāramitā sutras due to his association with the Abhidharma, which teaches that dharmas are the final reality. This is in contrast to the core teachings of Prajñāpāramitā sutras, which teach that all dharmas are empty, thus making Śāriputra the ideal counterpoint.

=== Other Mahayana Sutras ===
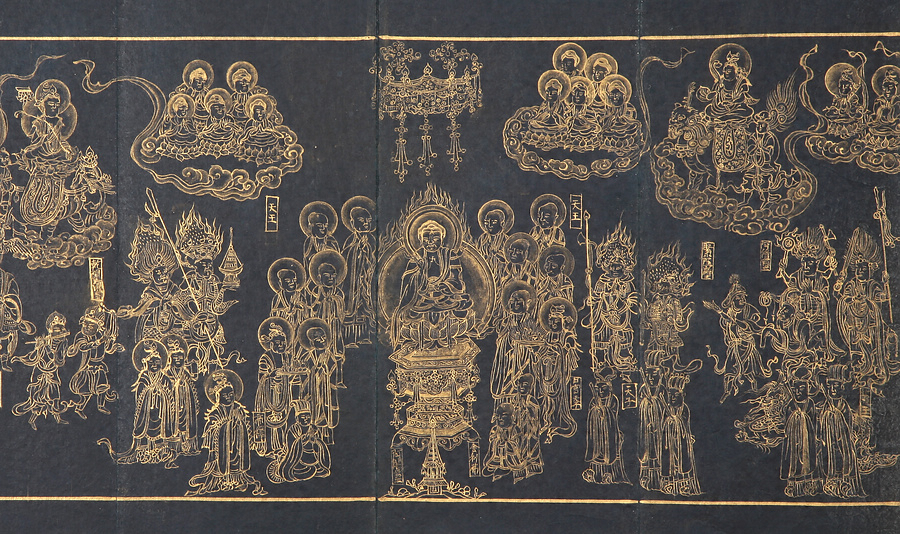
Japanese depiction of the Lotus Sutra, where Śāriputra prompts the Buddha to preach.

Śāriputra plays a major role in the Heart Sutra, where the teaching is directed at him. Śāriputra prompts the teaching of the sutra by asking the Mahayana bodhisattva Avalokiteśvara how to practice wisdom. Avalokiteśvara's response to Śāriputra, then makes up the body of the sutra. When Avalokiteśvara finishes the sutra the Buddha shows approval of the teaching, and Śāriputra, Avalokiteśvara, and the audience then rejoice. In the Lotus Sutra, the Buddha starts talking about the higher wisdom of buddhas and his use of skillful means (Sanskrit: upāya) to teach the Dharma, which leaves the arhats in the assembly confused. Śāriputra then asks the Buddha to explain his teachings for the benefit of other beings, prompting the Buddha to teach the Lotus Sutra. Later in the sutra, the Buddha explains that Śāriputra had followed the bodhisattva path in past lives but had forgotten and followed the Śrāvaka path in this life. The Buddha then assures Śāriputra that he will also achieve buddhahood and declares that Śāriputra will become the future Buddha Padmaprabha. In the listing of the great arhats in the assembly at the beginning of the Longer Sukhāvatīvyūha Sūtra, Śāriputra is mentioned as the fifteenth of the great arhats, while in the Shorter Sukhāvatīvyūha Sūtra he is placed as the first.

== Relics ==
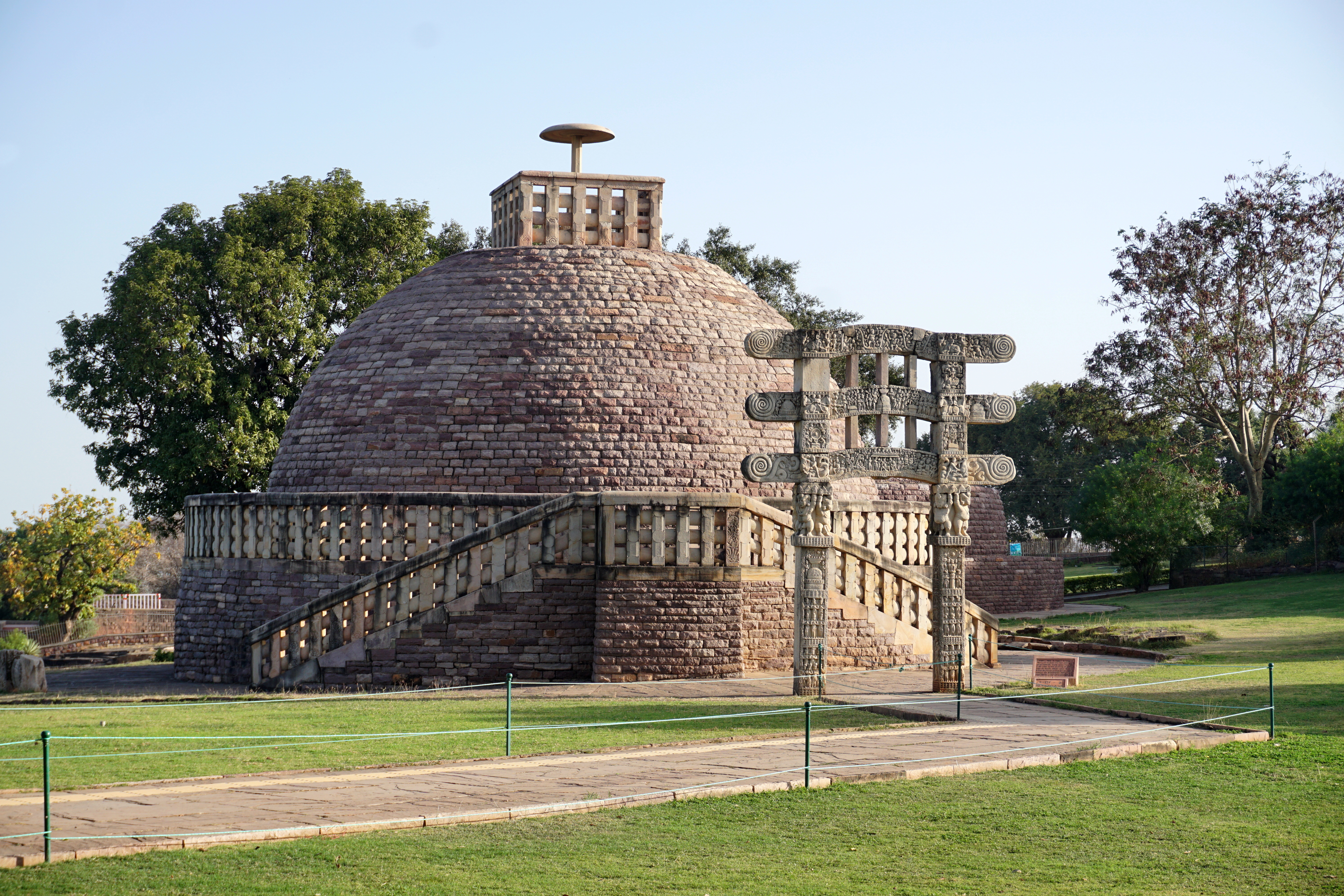
One of the Sanchi stupas, where relics of Śāriputra were excavated.

According to accounts from the 7th century Chinese pilgrim Xuanzang, Śāriputra's as well as Maudgalyāyana's relics could be found in the Indian city of Mathura in stupas built by King Asoka. However, as of 1999, no archaeological reports had confirmed such findings at the sites mentioned by either Chinese pilgrims or Buddhist texts, although findings were made at other sites.

In 1851, archaeologists Alexander Cunningham and Lieutenant Fred. C. Maisey discovered a pair of sandstone boxes with encased bone fragments inside during an excavation of one of the stupas in the city of Sanchi, with Śāriputra's and Maudgalyāyana's names inscribed on them in Brāhmī text. Śāriputra's casket contained pieces of sandalwood, which Cunningham believed was part of Śāriputra's funeral pyre. Śāriputra's box was positioned at the south, while Maudgalyāyana's was positioned at the north. According to Cunningham, people in ancient India sat facing the east during religious ceremonies and even used the word east (para) for "front", as well as the word south (dakshina) for "right" and the word north (vami) for "left", meaning the positioning of the caskets symbolized each disciple's relative positions as right and left hand disciple respectively. This positioning has also been explained by the fact that the Buddha traditionally sat facing the east, which would make the south his right hand side, and the north his left hand side. Another excavation by Cunningham and Maisey at stupas in the nearby town of Satdhāra found another pair of caskets with encased bone fragments with the two chief disciples' names inscribed. Cunningham concluded that the relics were enshrined in stupas near Rajagaha after the disciples' deaths until the time of King Asoka, who then redistributed them in stupas throughout India. Scholars have also theorized that a Sunga king may have also done a similar redistribution of the relics of the Buddha and his leading disciples and built stupas such as the one in Sanchi to enshrine them.

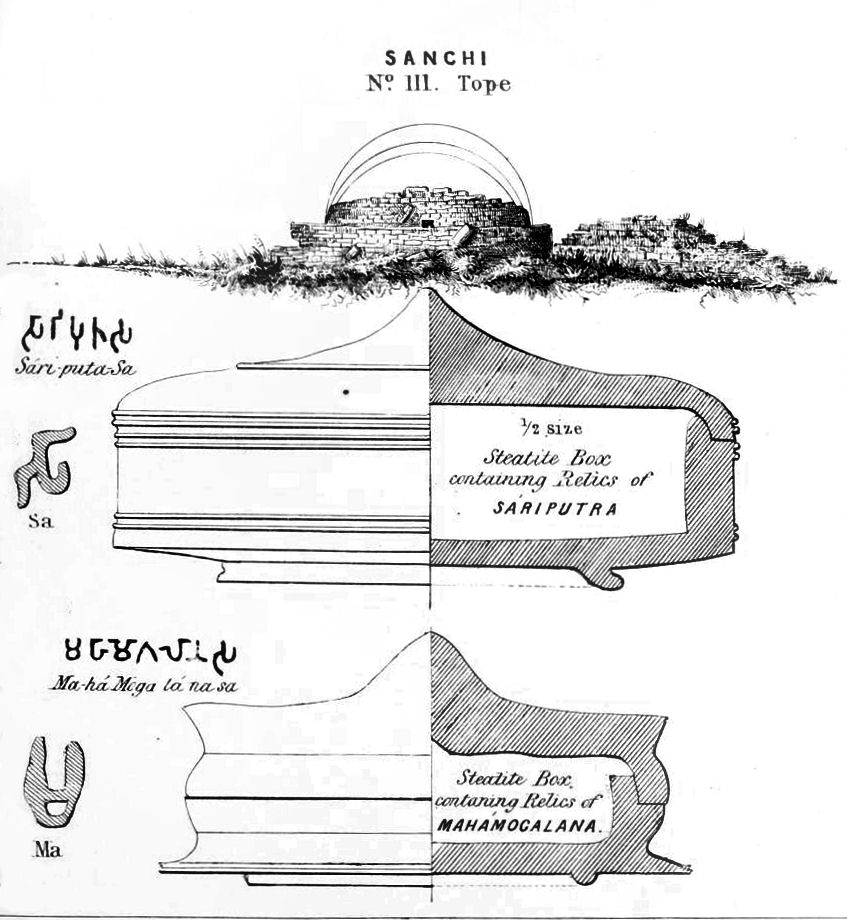
Sketch made by Cunningham of the Sanchi relic caskets attributed to the chief disciples.

Cunningham and Maisey later divided their findings among each other, with Maisey bringing the Satdhāra relics to Britain and eventually loaning them to the Victoria and Albert Museum in London in 1866. The relics were eventually purchased by the Museum in 1921 from Maisley's son. Cunningham brought his findings to Britain on two ships, one of which sank, thus the Sanchi relics are believed to have been lost. However, historian Torkel Brekke argues that Maisey took all the relics with him, and thus the Sanchi relics went to Britain along with the Satdhāra ones. In the early 20th century, Buddhist organizations in India and Burma began pressuring the British government to return the relics to India, where they can be properly venerated. Although the Victoria and Albert Museum initially resisted, the British government eventually ordered them to return the relics for diplomatic reasons. The relics were transferred to predominantly Buddhist Sri Lanka in 1947 in accordance with an agreement made with Buddhist organizations, where they were put on temporary display at the Colombo Museum. In 1949, the relics were sent to India where they were put on tour around northern India and various parts of Asia. In 1950, the relics were sent on tour to Burma, with Burmese Prime Minister U Nu later asking India for a portion of the relics. Indian Prime Minister Jawaharlal Nehru agreed to make a "permanent loan" of a portion of the relics to Burma where they were enshrined in the Kaba Aye Pagoda in 1952. Sri Lanka also obtained a portion of the relics, which were brought from Sanchi in 1952 and kept at the Maha Bodhi Society in Sri Lanka. The portion of the relics that remained in India were enshrined at the Chethiyagiri Vihara in Sanchi, also in 1952.

== Legacy ==
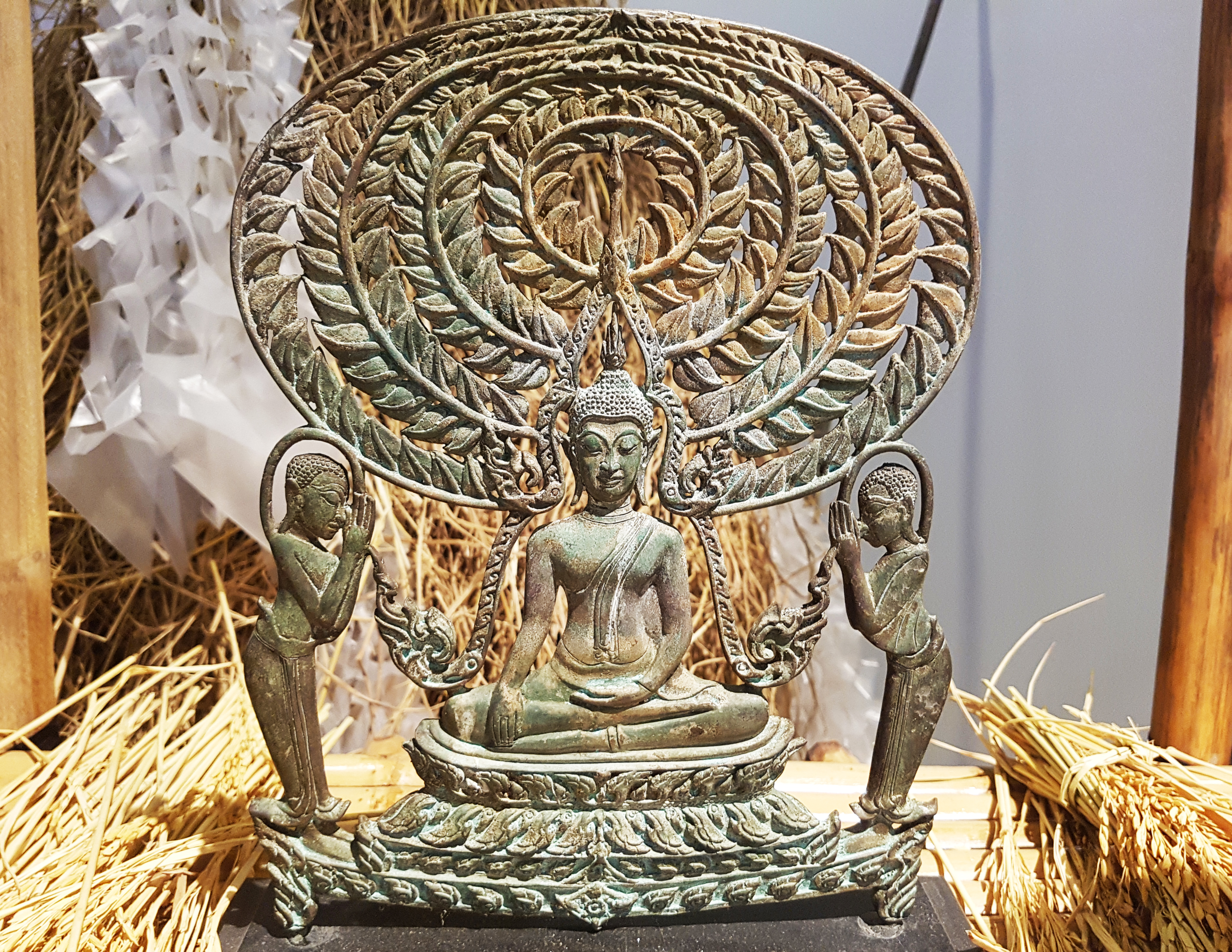
Image of the Buddha with his chief disciples at Bangkok Art and Culture Centre. Śāriputra is traditionally depicted on the right side of the Buddha while Maudgalyāyana is traditionally depicted on the left.

As the chief disciple of the Buddha, Śāriputra is considered to be a particularly important figure in Buddhism, especially in the Theravada tradition. According to Buddhist academic Reginald Ray, Śāriputra was the greatest arhat in the Pali Canon and is ranked in the canon as being close to a second Buddha. In one text, he is referred to as "King of the Dharma" (Sanskrit: Dharmaraja) a title generally reserved for the Buddha, and is described in several texts as one who "spins the wheel of the Dharma", a prerogative generally associated with Buddhas. In the Pali Canon, Śāriputra is credited as the main expounder of several suttas, due to the Buddha trusting in his profound teaching ability. Indologist Alex Wayman describes Śāriputra as being exemplary of the four brahma-vihārās, and credits these virtues with why the Buddha entrusted him with leadership of the Sangha.

In Buddhist art, he is often depicted alongside the Buddha and Maudgalyāyana, with Śāriputra usually depicted on the Buddha's right hand side and Maudgalyāyana usually depicted on the Buddha's left hand side. According to Nyanaponika Thera, this imagery symbolizes the relative positions they held in life, with Śāriputra being the Buddha's right hand monk. In Mahayana Buddhism this iconography of flanking the Buddha on his right and left is sometimes used for other figures as well, such as the Mahayana bodhisattvas Samantabhadra and Mañjuśrī, or the disciples Ānanda and Mahākāśyapa. In Burma, Śāriputra is believed to grant wisdom to worshippers, and is one of eight arhats commonly shown devotion to in protective rituals.

Śāriputra is notable for being representative of scholarship and settled monasticism, rather than the forest Buddhism that most of the Buddha's principal disciples are associated with. Ray describes Śāriputra as the "prototypical" Buddhist saint who embodied the ideal of the Southern Buddhism that developed in ancient Kosambi. However, Ray points out that some Pali texts, such as the Udana and Theragatha, portray Śāriputra as a forest saint. He concludes that there are at least two traditions linked to him in Pali texts, forest and scholarly. Migot identifies texts that exclude Śāriputra's scholastic character as the earliest sources, and goes on to argue that the historic Śāriputra was different from the person preserved in the Pali Canon. He argues that Śāriputra was venerated as a saint in the ancient Kosambi region and that the early Sthavira school of Buddhism developed his scholarly side in accordance to the tradition's values in the region at the time, indicating that Śāriputra may originally have been a forest saint. Ray states that while it is possible Śāriputra's scholastic character was the result of texts that were added later, there is insufficient evidence to conclude to this.

== See also ==
- Bhadda Kundalakesa, a former Jain ascetic converted to Buddhism by Sāriputta
- Sammaditthi Sutta, a Pali Canon discourse attributed to Sāriputta
- Sariputra in the Jatakas
- Citta
- Hatthaka of Alavi
