= Sariputra in the Jatakas =

Sariputra, one of the two chief disciples of Gautama Buddha is frequently described in the Jataka, a collection of Buddhist texts which describe the previous reincarnations of the Buddha and his closest disciples. Pali texts mention Sariputra in 150 Jatakas, the second most of any disciple of the Buddha, second only to Ananda. The Jatakas depict a multitude of previous lives in which Sariputra interacted with previous reincarnations of the Buddha and Mahamoggallana, the other of the two chief disciples. Such frequent relations in the past are consistent with the Buddhist theory of karma, with the consequences of the present being intricately linked to causes and actions committed in the past. Sariputra also interacts with the reincarnations of Ananda, the chief attendant of the Buddha, and Devadatta, a cousin and arch-rival of the Buddha.

In the Jatakas, the Bodhisattva and Sariputra assume various roles in their interactions; in some existences, Sariputra is the teacher of the Bodhisattva as pupil; these occur in the Susima (163), Cula Nandiya (223), Silavimamsa (305), Karandiya (356) and Maha Dhammapala (447) Jatakas. In the Maha Dhammapala, the future Buddha gives Sariputra, his teacher the lesson of not giving the Five Precepts indiscriminately to those who have no interest in accepting nor the resolve to live by them.

In several previous existences, Sariputra is a human being while the future Gautama Buddha is an animal. These include the Cula Nandiya Jataka (223), the Romaka Jataka (277), the Bhojajaniya Jataka (23) and the Dummedha Jataka (122). In the Romaka, Sariputra is a wise ascetic who instructs a partridge.

In other stories, the roles are reversed, such as the Jarudapana (256) and Kundakakucchi Sindhava (254) Jatakas, where Sariputra is an animal and the Bodhisattva is a human reincarnation. In some cases such as the Kurungamiga Jataka (206), both are animals. The previous reincarnations of Sariputra show characteristics that he displayed in his final existence on earth, such as wisdom, virtue and leadership. Many of these Jatakas depict him in partnership and working together with the future Gautama Buddha and Mahamoggalana.

There are various accounts of reincarnations in the Jataka depicting Sariputra counteracting the evil behaviour of Devadatta, in particular towards the future Buddha. In the Lakkhana Jataka (11), Sariputra was one of two male stag siblings, each leading his own herd. Sariputra safely guided his herd back to the hills, while his foolish brother Devadatta loses his whole herd. In the Dummedha Jataka (122), Sariputra is a king of Varanasi, who is able to appreciate excellence when he sees it. The Bodhisattva was a white elephant. Devadatta was the king of Magadha who had owned the elephant but lost it through jealousy. In the Cula Nandiya Jataka (223), Sariputra is a spiritual teacher who advises his student Devadatta not to be harsh, cruel and violent, without success. In the Khantivadi Jataka (313), the future Gautama Buddha was a wise ascetic who was arrested and tortured by King Kalabu (Devadatta). Sariputta was Kalabu's army chief and he bandaged the Bodhisattva's wounds. In the Kurungamiga Jataka (206), Sariputra is a woodpecker while Mahamoggallana is a tortoise. They save the life of the Bodhisattva, an antelope, from a hunter (Devadatta). The woodpecker later saves the imprisoned tortoise. This mirrors their final human reincarnations where Devadatta causes a split in the sangha but Sariputra and Mahamoggallana win back the monks that Devadatta had led away.

There are other various depictions of previous reincarnations which exhibit the bond between Sariputra and Gautama Buddha. The Maha Paduma Jataka (472) describes how Sariputra, as a hill spirit, saved the life of the Bodhisatta, who was Prince Maha Paduma. In the Mamsa Jataka (315), the Bodhisattva convinced Sariputra to give up his profession as a hunter. In the Kotisimbali Jataka (412), Sariputra is a king of the Garudas (supanna-raja) who saves a tree which was the abode of the future Buddha, who had a reincarnation as a tree spirit. In the Bhojajaniya Jataka (23), the Bodhisatta was a warhorse riddent by Sariputra, who was a warrior. The pair combined to capture seven kings who were hostile to their own monarch. In the Jarudapana Jataka (256), Sariputra was a Naga king who helps the Bodhisattva, a merchant, to transport some treasure found by the merchant.

In total, there were thirty reincarnations where Mahamoggallana and Sariputra had lived together. They were often brothers, friends, Ministers of one another or disciples and spiritual teachers of one another. In the 525th Jataka, Sariputra is the son and Mahamoggallana the general of the royal Bodhisattva. When the Buddha was reborn as Sakka, King of Gods, Sariputra and Mahamoggallana were the moon and the sun god respectively, analogous to their roles as the two chief disciples of Gautama Buddha. In the Jataka stories, both Mahamoggallana and Sariputra are seen to traverse all the heights and depths of Samsara, sometimes playing quite inferior parts in relation to the main figures of the respective stories. In most cases the difference in status between the pair is larger than the degree in which their level of rebirth is lower. There is less difference in status when their rebirth is at a higher realm. When reborn as animals, being born in equal species four times, all of them as swans. In most cases, Sariputra was born in a higher species of animals. Sariputra and Mahamoggalana were respectively born as snake and rat, snake and jackal, and man and jackal. When born as humans in worldly careers, Sariputra was invariably in a higher position: as a royal prince and royal minister, royal minister and son of a slave, charioteer of the royal Bodhisattva and charioteer of king Ananda (J. 151). In one instance, Mahamoggallana was the moon god and Sariputra a wise ascetic Narada. However, when both are ascetics or deities, they are mostly of equal states. In one case, Sariputra was only the moon god and Mahamoggallana the superior sun god; once Sariputra was the king of the Nagas (serpent deities) and Mahaoggallana the king of their foes, the Supannas (mythical birds of deity status).

The only instance in which Mahamoggallana appears in the Jatakas without Sariputra, is a reincarnation in which he holds the office of Sakka, King of Gods. In Majjhima Nikaya 37, Mahamoggallana admonishes one of his successors to that office. At that time, as Sakka, he also appeared on the earthly realms to a scrooge in order to urge on him the virtue of charity and thus to lead him to a better rebirth. However in another life, when Sariputra and Mahamoggallana lived on earth, they were stingy businessmen who buried substantial sums of money. After their deaths, they were reborn close to their buried treasure, but as a snake and a rat.
