= Rūpaśārī =

Figure in early Buddhism

Sārī
- Sārī
- Born: Nālaka (Upatissa-gāma), Magadha
- Other names: Rūpaśārī, The Brahmin Lady Sārī
- Known for: Mother of Sariputta (Chief Disciple of the Buddha)
- Spouse: Vaṅganta
- Children: Sariputta; Upasena; Mahā-Cunda; Revata; Cālā; Upacālā; Sīsūpacālā

Rūpaśārī (also known simply as Sārī or the Brahmin lady Sārī) was a figure in early Buddhism, best known as the mother of Sāriputta, the chief male disciple of Gautama Buddha. A staunch Brahmin by birth, she is frequently depicted in Buddhist texts as initially hostile towards the Buddha's order for "taking away" her children, before eventually converting to Buddhism shortly before her son's death.

== Life ==
Rūpaśārī lived in the village of Nālaka, also known as Upatissa-gāma, in the kingdom of Magadha in ancient India. She was married to the Brahmin Vaṅganta. Together they had seven children, all of whom later entered the Buddhist monastic order and attained arahantship. Their children were Sāriputta, who was born with the name Upatissa, along with Upasena, Mahā-Cunda, Revata, also known as Khadiravaniya Revata and three daughters named Cālā, Upacālā, and Sīsūpacālā. Because her name was Sārī, her eldest son Upatissa came to be known as Sāriputta, meaning "son of Sārī".

For much of her life, Rūpaśārī was a devout follower of Brahmanism and deeply resented the Buddhist Order. She was distressed that her children had renounced their substantial family wealth (worth eighty crores) to become mendicants. She also attempted to prevent her youngest son, Revata, from ordaining by arranging a marriage for him at the age of seven, though he escaped and joined the order regardless. Rūpaśārī accused the Buddha of depriving her of the company of her sons, as he had taken all of her children into the monastic order one after another.

Buddhist commentaries, particularly the Dhammapada Aṭṭhakathā, recount instances where she verbally abused her son Sāriputta. On one occasion, when Sāriputta visited her with a retinue of 500 monks, she offered them food but scolded him, calling him an "eater of leavings" (leftovers) and criticizing him for abandoning his inheritance to live on alms. Sāriputta is praised in the texts for bearing this abuse with perfect patience and silence.

=== Enlightenment ===
According to Pali accounts, Śāriputta, knowing that his life was drawing to a close, decided to return to his childhood home in Nālaka in order to repay his "debt of nurture" to his mother by teaching her the Dhamma. After hearing that her son was returning home, Sārī was initially overjoyed; however, upon seeing that he remained a monk, she again refused to see or speak with him. As Śāriputta grew progressively weaker, she continued to keep her distance. On the night before his final nirvāṇa, it is said that numerous celestial beings including the Four Heavenly Kings, Sakka (King of the Gods), and Mahā Brahmā visited him to pay their final respects. The celestial radiance awakened Sārī, and upon witnessing these beings honoring her son, she realized that he was no ordinary monk. Only then did she speak with him.

Śāriputta subsequently taught her the essence of the Buddha's teachings, commonly identified as the Four Noble Truths. As a result of this discourse, she is said to have attained the stage of Sotāpanna (stream-entry), the first stage of enlightenment. Śāriputta passed away the following morning, having attained Parinibbāna. She made all the arrangements for the funeral, and Vissakamma assisted in the ceremony. When the cremation was over, Anuruddha extinguished the flames with perfumed water, and Cunda gathered the relics.

== Confusion ==
There is a common source of confusion in Buddhist folklore involving a figure identified as Śāriputta's mother appearing as a preta (hungry ghost). According to this tradition, a female hungry ghost once appeared to Śāriputta, emaciated and frightening in appearance. She told him, "I was your mother in a previous life, not this one. Because of my stinginess in that past life, I have been reborn in this miserable state."

Out of compassion, Śāriputta is said to have arranged for the construction of four huts for the Saṅgha and dedicated the merit of this act to the hungry ghost. As a result, she was immediately released from her suffering and reborn as a minor deity (devī). This act of merit-making later became associated in some traditions with origin stories of the Ghost Festival. Legends often distinguish between Rūpaśārī (his mother in final life) and his mother from a past life (who was stingy and suffered as a ghost).
