= Anomadassi =

Tenth of 28 Buddhas

Anomadassi Buddha
- Sanskrit: अनवमदर्शिन् Anavamadarśin
- Pāli: Anomadassi
- Burmese: အနောမဒဿီဘုရား
- Chinese: 超見佛
- Korean: 최상견불 (RR: Choesanggyen Bul)
- Sinhala: අනෝමදස්සි බුදුන් වහන්සේ Anomadassi Budun Wahanse
- Thai: พระอโนมทัสสีพุทธเจ้า; Phra Anomathassi Phutthachao
- Vietnamese: Phật Siêu Kiến; Phật Cao Kiến

Information
- Venerated by: Theravada, Mahayana, Vajrayana

According to Theravada Buddhism's Pali canon's Buddhavamsa and its commentary, Anomadassi is the tenth of twenty-seven Buddhas who preceded the historical Gotama Buddha. He was also the first Buddha of the Vara kalpa.

In the Buddhavamsa, he is described as:

Anomadassi Buddha is like a large ocean, a mountain that one hardly approaches, the infinite sky, or a Sal tree that can bloom well.

Anomadassi was 58 cubits, or 87 feet tall and his stupa was 25 yojana, or about 191 miles high.

== Biography ==
=== From birth to enlightenment ===
Anomadassi was born in Chandawatinagara. His parents were King Yasavā and Queen Yasodharā. He was married to Queen Sirimādevi and reigned the country for 10,000 years. His son was Upavāna.

As soon as his son was born, he decided to leave the palace to practise asceticism. Thirty million servants followed him to become fellow ascetics. He practised for ten months. After practising for ten months, he left his servant ascetics and went to the Terminalia elliptica tree. He began to practise peacefully under the tree and gained enlightenment the next morning.

=== Gotama Buddha getting the omen ===
At Anomadassi's time, Gotama Buddha was a Bilu (English: Ogre, Burmese:ဘီလူး) leader. After listening to the teachings of the Buddha, he invited him and his disciples to his place. He fed them and filled their needs for seven days. After a week of donation, Anomadassi said:

"This ogre will become a Buddha named Gotama in the Bhadda kalpa that will appear after many aeons."

The incarnation of Gotama Buddha, having his wish granted, decided to practice Pāramitā.
