= André Migot =

French doctor, traveler, and writer (1892–1967)

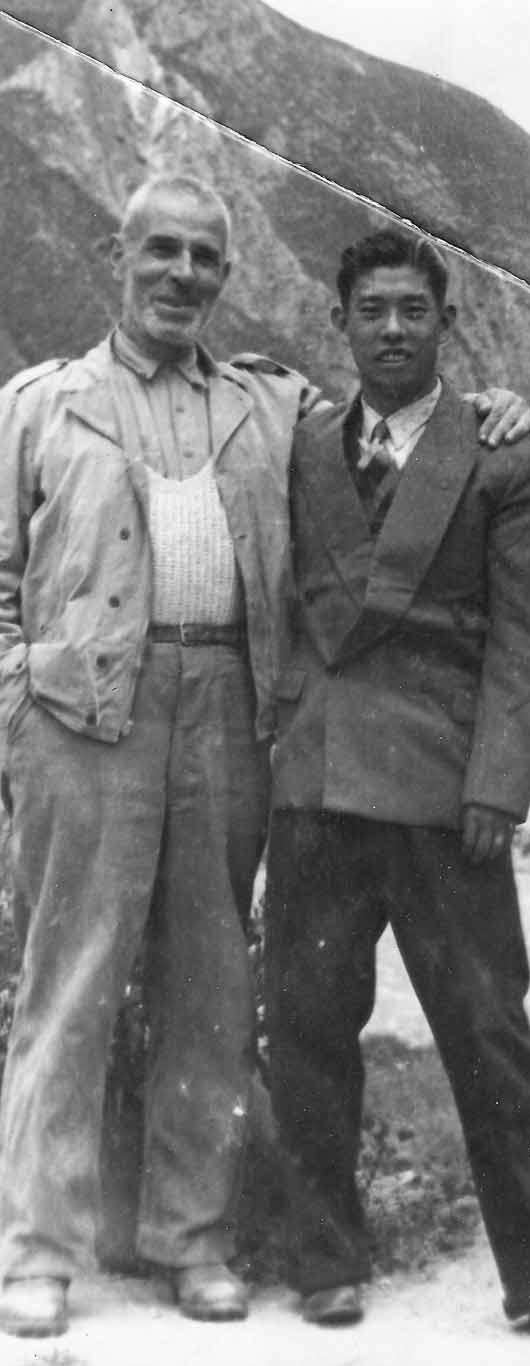
André Migot in 1948 in Dergué

André Migot (1892–1967) was a French doctor, traveler and writer.

He served as an army medical officer in World War I, winning the Croix de Guerre. After the war he engaged in research in marine biology, and then practised as a doctor in France; in his spare time, he climbed in the Alps and Pyrenees. In 1938 he set off to India by bicycle to pursue his interest in Oriental religions. During World War II he worked as a doctor in occupied Paris.

After the war he went to Indochina, whence in 1947 he made a journey alone through Eastern Tibet and China in order to research aspects of Tibetan Buddhism. During this journey he tried but failed to reach Lhasa disguised as a mendicant lama. As he could speak and write Tibetan, he was able to converse with the lamas, and was initiated into the Karma Kagyu lineage at Shangu Gompa, a lamasery outside modern-day Yushu. This journey is described in his best-known book Caravane vers Bouddha, translated into English by Peter Fleming as Tibetan Marches.

From Beijing, where his previous account concludes in 1948, he embarked on another arduous journey—this time returning through Tibet to Indochina. He later served for two years as a doctor with a French expedition on the Kerguelen Islands. In 1954, he joined an Australian expedition in the same region.

He wrote many other books on his travels, and on Oriental religion and philosophy.

== Bibliography ==
- Migot, André (translated by Peter Fleming) (1955). Tibetan Marches, Rupert Hart-Davis, London
- Migot, André (1956). Thin Edge of the World, Little, Brown and Company, Boston
