= Edward J. Thomas =

English classicist, librarian and author

Edward Joseph Thomas (30 July 1869 – 11 February 1958) was an English classicist, librarian and author of several books on the history of Buddhism.

== Biography ==
Thomas was born in Thornhill, West Yorkshire. He was the son of a gardener at Thornhill Rectory. Thomas left school and worked as a gardener for twelve years. In 1896, he enrolled and under the supervision of John Burnet obtained a master's degree in classics from the University of St Andrews in 1900–1901. He studied linguistics at Emmanuel College, Cambridge and graduated from the University of Cambridge in 1905. He was the curator of the university's library for many years and was appointed Dean of the Oriental Languages Department.

His works, mainly concerned with Theravada Buddhism and reflecting Western scholarship, nonetheless remain widely cited for their clarity and accuracy. The Life of Buddha as Legend and History is inevitably cited in Buddhist research. Thomas's ability as a Pali scholar and translator was noted in his time.

Thomas has been described as "one of England’s most brilliant Buddhist scholars".

== Publications ==
- Jataka Tales (1916) [with Henry Thomas Francis]
- The Life of Buddha: As Legend and History (1927, 3rd. ed. 1952)
- The Perfection of Wisdom, The Career of the Predestined Buddhas, A Selection of Mahayana Scriptures translated from the Sanskrit (London, J. Murray, 1952; rpr. Wisdom of the East Series, Rutland, Charles E. Tuttle, 1992)
- The History of Buddhist Thought (London: Kegan Paul, 1933; repub. 1951, 1953)
- Early Buddhist Scriptures (1935)
- The Song of the Lord: Bhagavadgita (1931)
- Vedic Hymns (1923)
