= Faith in Buddhism =

Important element of the teachings of the Buddha

Translations of Faith
- Sanskrit: श्रद्धा (IAST: śraddhā)
- Pali: saddhā
- Bengali: শ্রদ্ধা (shroddha)
- Chinese: 信(T&S) (Pinyin: xìn)
- Indonesian: keyakinan, iman
- Japanese: 信 (Rōmaji: shin)
- Khmer: សទ្ធា (UNGEGN: satthea)
- Korean: 믿음 (RR: mid-eum)
- Sinhala: ශ්‍රද්ධාව (shraddhawa)
- Tibetan: དད་པ (Wylie: dad pa THL: dat pa)
- Thai: ศรัทธา (RTGS: satthaa)
- Vietnamese: tín

The disciple Ānanda (at left) is the traditional example of the faithful disciple of the Buddha.

In Buddhism, faith (saddhā, śraddhā) refers to a serene commitment to the practice of the Buddha's teaching, and to trust in enlightened or highly developed beings, such as Buddhas or bodhisattvas (those aiming to become a Buddha). Buddhists usually recognize multiple objects of faith, but many are especially devoted to one in particular, such as one particular Buddha. Faith may not only be devotion to a person, but exists in relation to Buddhist concepts like the efficacy of karma and the possibility of enlightenment.

Faith in early Buddhism focused on the Triple Gem, that is: the Buddha; his teaching (the dharma); and the community of spiritually developed followers or the monastic community seeking enlightenment (the saṅgha).

A faithful devotee was called an upāsaka or upāsika, a status for which no formal initiation was required. Early Buddhism valued personal verification of spiritual truth as the best way to attain such truth, and in comparison considered sacred scriptures, reason, or faith in a teacher to be less valuable sources of authority. As important as faith was, it was merely a first step on the path to wisdom and enlightenment; faith would become obsolete or redefined at the final stage of that path. Early Buddhism did not morally condemn peaceful offerings to deities. Throughout the history of Buddhism, the worship of deities, often from pre-Buddhist and animist origins, was appropriated or transformed into Buddhist practices and beliefs. As part of this process, such deities were explained as subordinate to the Triple Gem, which still kept a central role.

In the later strata of Buddhist history, especially in Mahāyāna Buddhism, faith was given a much more important role. Mahāyāna introduced devotion to Buddhas and bodhisattvas residing in Pure Lands. With the rise of devotion to the Amithaba Buddha in Pure Land Buddhism faith gained a central role in Buddhist practice. The Japanese form of Pure Land Buddhism, under the teachers Hōnen and Shinran, believed that only entrusting faith toward the Amitābha Buddha was a fruitful form of practice; it dismissed celibacy, meditation, and other Buddhist practices as no longer effective, or as contradicting the virtue of faith. Pure Land Buddhists defined faith as a state similar to enlightenment, with an accompanying sense of self-negation and humility. Mahāyāna sutras, such as the Lotus Sutra, became objects of worship, and the recitation and copying of these sutras were believed to create great merit. The impact of faith in Buddhist religiosity became pivotal in millenarian movements in several Buddhist countries, which sometimes resulted in the destruction of royal dynasties and other important political changes.

Thus, the role of faith increased throughout Buddhist history. However, from the nineteenth century onward, in countries like Sri Lanka and Japan, and also in the West, Buddhist modernism has downplayed and criticized the role of faith in Buddhism. Faith in Buddhism still has a role in modern Asia and the West, but is understood and defined differently from traditional interpretations, with modern values and eclecticism becoming more important.

== Role in Buddhist teaching ==
Faith is defined as serene trust that the practice of the Buddha's teaching will bring fruit. It is trust and surrender to enlightened or highly developed beings, such as Buddhas or bodhisattvas, or even certain highly respected monks or lamas, who are sometimes seen as living Buddhas. Buddhists usually recognize multiple objects of faith, but many are especially devoted to one particular object of faith, such as one particular Buddha. Buddhism has, however, never been organized around one central authority, neither as a person or a scripture. Scriptures have usually acted as guidance, and consensus about practices has come about through debate and discussion.

Several terms are used in Buddhism for faith, which have both cognitive and affective aspects:

- Śraddhā (Sanskrit; Pāli: saddhā; classical Chinese: wen-hsin) refers to a sense of commitment to or trust in someone else, or a sense of engagement and commitment to practise. Traditional examples of this are the monks Ānanda, the attendant of Gautama Buddha, and Vakkali, another disciple. Śraddhā is often seen as the counteragent of ill-will in the mind. The opposite of śraddhā is āśraddhya, which refers to the lack of capacity to develop faith in a teacher and the teachings, and therefore being unable to develop energy on the spiritual path. The word śraddhā originates from the roots śrat, "to have conviction", and dhā, "to uphold", (Note: Some scholars disagree with these glosses, however. Also, in the Vedas śraddhā is understood as an "attitude of mind based on truth".) and thus, according to religious studies scholar Sung-bae Park, indicates "sustaining confidence, remaining steadfast, or supporting trust, in the sense of abiding firmly".
- Prasāda (Sanskrit; Pāli: pasāda; classical Chinese: ching-hsin) is more affective than śraddhā. Being used with regard to rituals and ceremonies, it refers to a sense of serene acceptance of the blessings and greatness of the object of one's devotion. The word prasāda derives from the prefix pra and the root sād, which mean "to sink down, to sit", and is defined by Park as "being firmly seated in a state of clearness and tranquility". Thus, prasāda refers to the focus of the devotee's mind, its commitment and its heightened quality. It is described in more spontaneous terms than śraddhā.

Faith is usually related to the Triple Gem, that is the Buddha, the dharma (his teaching) and the saṅgha (the community). Thus, faith may often have certain individuals as its object, but is different from devotion in other Indian religions (bhakti) in that it is connected with impersonal objects such as the working of karma and the efficacy of merit transfer. It is seen to focus on or lead to a right view or understanding of the main aspects of the Buddha's teaching, such as the working of karma, merit and rebirth. Regarding the Triple Gem, faith focuses on and rejoices in the characteristics of the Buddha, the dharma, and the saṅgha. With regard to the working of karma, faith refers to a conviction that deeds have effects, good deeds having positive effects, and wrong deeds negative. Thus, faith gives guidance in leading a life of charity, morality, and religious qualities. Faith also covers ideas such as the nature of existence, its impermanence and conditioned nature, and finally, the Buddha's enlightenment or Nirvana and the path of practice leading up to Nirvana. Faith entails a belief that there are people who have attained Nirvana and are able to teach it.

== History ==
Hajime Nakamura distinguishes two currents in Buddhism, which he describes as the devotional approach and the approach of "inner knowledge". Anthropologist Melford Spiro discusses bhakti (devotion) on the one hand and magga (the path to deliverance) on the other hand. In the development of the understanding of faith, two historical layers can be distinguished: early Buddhism and the later Mahāyāna Buddhism. Some early twentieth-century scholars, such as Louis de La Vallée-Poussin, Arthur Berriedale Keith, and Caroline Rhys Davids, have been criticized by Sri Lankan scholars for not distinguishing the two sufficiently.

=== Early Buddhism ===
In early Buddhist texts, such as Pāli texts, saddhā is usually translated as "faith", but with a different connotation than the English word. It is sometimes also translated as "confidence", as in confidence in doctrine. Faith in early Buddhism, in the words of scholar John Bishop, is essentially "religious without being theistic". It does not focus on a God as the centre of the religion. In contrast to Vedic Brahmanism, which preceded Buddhism, early Buddhist ideas of faith are more connected with the teachings that are learnt and practised, rather than focused on an outward deity. This does not mean that Buddhism's approach of reality had not been influenced by other traditions: at the time when Buddhism arose, several Indian religious communities taught a critical approach in understanding the truth.

Faith is not just a mental commitment to a set of principles, but also has an affective quality. Scholars in early Buddhism distinguish between faith as joy and serenity, raising the mind to a higher level; and faith as an energy producing self-confidence, required for dealing with temptations and for self-mastery. Because faith helps remove perplexity, it inspires and gives energy to the devotee.

A Buddhist thus aspires to faith in the Triple Gem and values discipline. In early Buddhist texts, however, faith does not mean a hostile response to, or lack of recognition of, other deities. Although the Buddha refutes the bloody sacrifice of animals, he does not condemn peaceful offerings to deities, but considers those far less useful than alms offerings to the monastic saṅgha. Everything is given its place in a hierarchy of usefulness, in which moral behaviour is much more highly regarded than rites and rituals.

Faith is the consequence of impermanence and a wise perception of suffering (dukkha). Reflection on suffering and impermanence leads the devotees to a sense of fear and agitation (saṃvega), which motivates them to take refugee in the Triple Gem and to cultivate faith. Faith then leads to many other important mental qualities on the path to nirvana, such as joy, concentration, and insight. Faith in itself, however, is never regarded as sufficient for the attainment of nirvana.

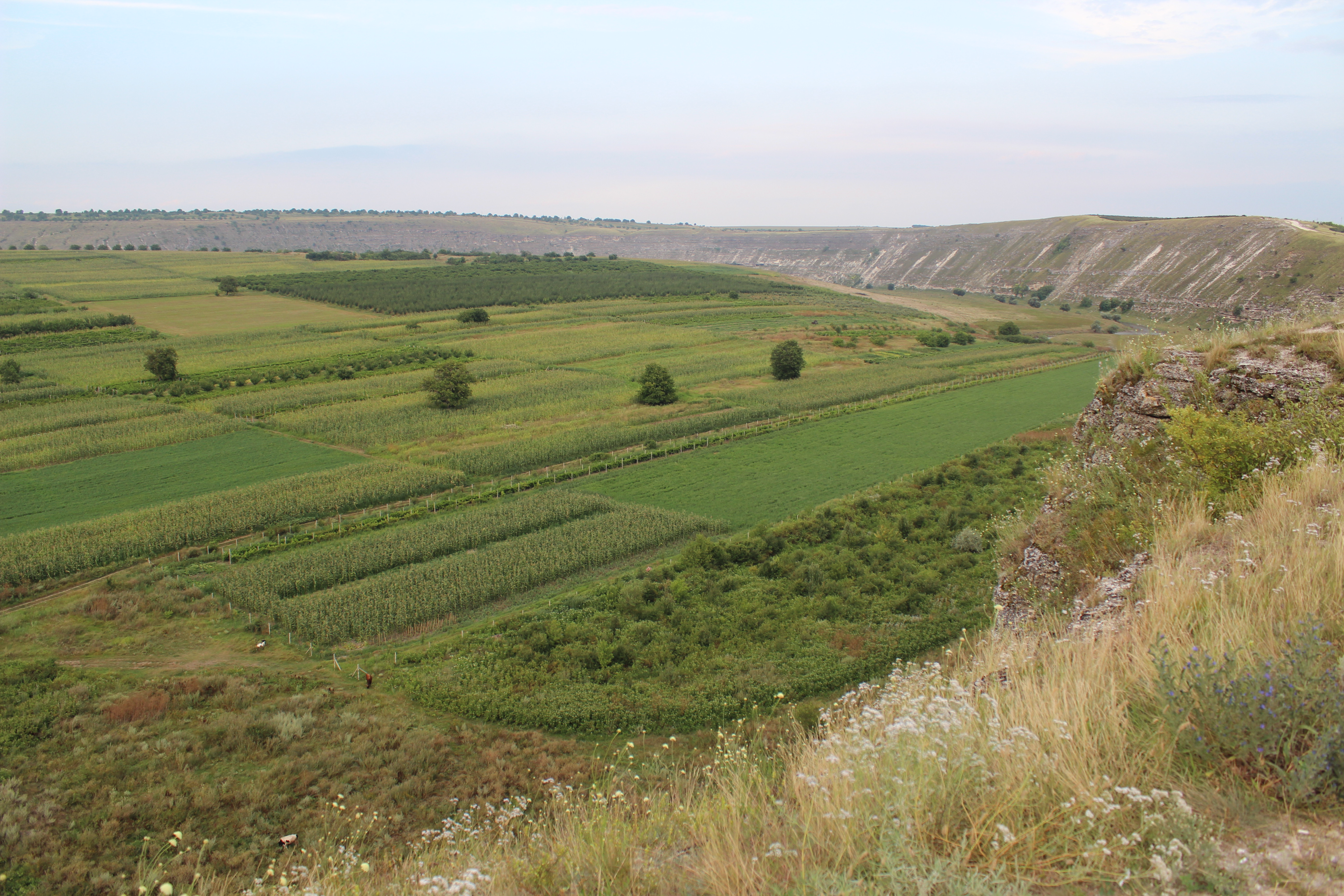
The saṅgha is described as a "field of merit", because Buddhists regard offerings to them as particularly karmically fruitful.

A faithful Buddhist layman or laywoman is called an upāsaka or upāsika, respectively. To become a layperson, no formal ritual is required. Some Pāli Canon passages, as well as later commentators such as Buddhaghosa, state that a Buddhist layman can go to heaven only by the strength of his faith in and love for the Buddha, yet in other passages faith is listed together with other virtues, such as morality, as qualities that lead the devotee to heaven. Regardless, faith is an important part of the ideal of Buddhist laypeople, as they are described to be in the habit of seeing the saṅgha, listening to their teachings, and most importantly, providing charity for the saṅgha. Saddhā in the lay life is strongly connected with dāna (generosity): the faithful gift is the most spiritually important gift.

Faith is included in lists of virtues for laypeople, and is described as a progressive quality for devotees, as a devotee who is new to the Buddhist religion is characterized as "young in devotion". Thus, there are various lists of virtues in which faith is included, and other early traditions also gave faith a prominent role, such as the Sarvāstivāda tradition. Moreover, early Buddhism describes faith as an important quality in stream-enterers, those who achieve a state preceding enlightenment. In standard descriptions of people going forth (taking ordination as a monk), faith is mentioned as an important motivation. Despite this role, some Indologists such as André Bareau and Lily De Silva believed early Buddhism did not assign the same value to faith as in some other religions, such as Christianity. André Bareau argued that "Buddhism has no comparable [idea of] pure faith as in Christianity... The idea of blind faith, an absolute faith in a master's word, goes completely against the spirit of early Buddhism." Translator Caroline Rhys Davids disagreed with such statements, however, stating that "faith is no less important than it is for all religions worthy of the name".

Indologist Richard Gombrich argues that Buddhism does not prescribe believing in someone or something to the extent of going against reason. He also believes the Buddha did not aim to create a religion that focuses on devotion to his person, though he recognizes that such devotion already started when the Buddha was still alive. He notes that there is a lot of material in the early scriptures emphasizing how important faith is, but argues that "the growth of Buddhist rites and liturgies was surely a wholly unintended consequence of the Buddha's preaching".

==== Taking refuge ====
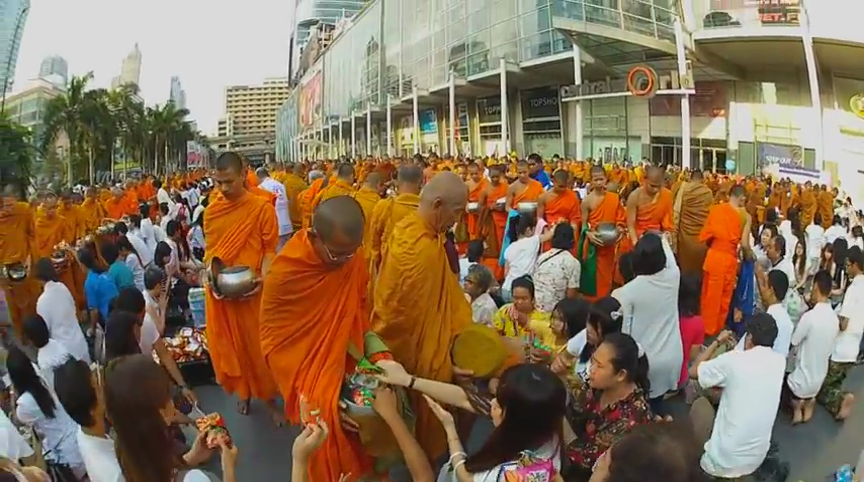
In the Pāli Canon, the Buddhist monk is given a significant role in promoting and upholding faith among laypeople.

Since early Buddhism, devotees expressed their faith through the act of taking refuge, which is threefold. It centres on the authority of a Buddha as a supremely awakened being, by assenting to a role for a Buddha as a teacher of both humans and devās (heavenly beings). This often includes other Buddhas from the past, and Buddhas who have not yet arisen. Secondly, the taking of refuge honours the truth and efficacy of the Buddha's spiritual doctrine, on subjects including the characteristics of phenomenon (saṅkhāra) such as their impermanence (anicca), and the path to liberation. The taking of refuge ends with accepting the worthiness of the community of spiritually developed followers (the saṅgha), which is mostly defined as the monastic community, but may also include lay people and even devās, provided they are nearly or completely enlightened. Early Buddhism did not include bodhisattvas in the Three Refuges, because they were considered to still be on the path to enlightenment.

Early texts describe the saṅgha as a "field of merit", because early Buddhists regard offerings to them as particularly karmically fruitful. Lay devotees support and revere the saṅgha, and believe this will render them merit and bring them closer to enlightenment. At the same time, the Buddhist monk is given a significant role in promoting and upholding faith among laypeople. Although many examples in the canon are mentioned of well-behaved monks, there are also cases of monks misbehaving. In such cases, the texts describe that the Buddha responds with great sensitivity to the perceptions of the lay community. When the Buddha sets out new rules in the monastic code to deal with the wrongdoings of his monastics, he usually states that such behaviour should be curbed, because it would not "persuade non-believers" and "believers will turn away". He expects monks, nuns, and novices not only to lead the spiritual life for their own benefit, but also to uphold the faith of the people. On the other hand, they are not to take the task of inspiring faith to the extent of hypocrisy or inappropriateness, for example, by taking on other professions apart from being a monastic, or by courting favours by giving items to the laypeople.

Thus, taking refuge is a form of aspiration to lead a life with the Triple Gem at its core. Taking refuge is done by means of a short formula in which one names the Buddha, the dharma, and the saṅgha as refuges. In early Buddhist scriptures, taking refuge is an expression of determination to follow the Buddha's path, but not a relinquishing of responsibility.

==== Through verification ====
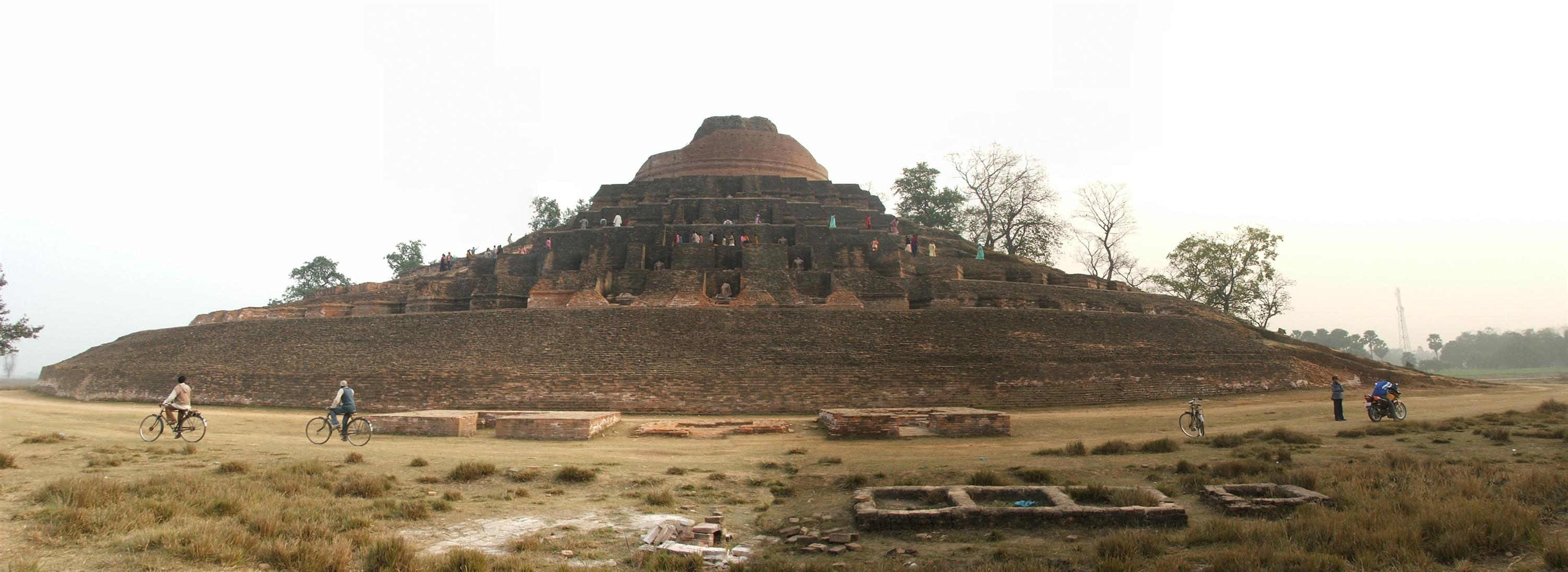
Buddhist stūpa in Kesariya, Bihar, India, erected in honour of the Kalāma Sutta

Faith can lead practitioners to take refuge in the Triple Gem, which opens them up to new spiritual experiences previously unknown to them. This is the devotional or mystical aspect of faith. But there is also a rational aspect, in that the value of taking refuge is rooted in personal verification. In the discourse (sutta) called the Kalāma Sutta, the Buddha argues against following sacred authority, tradition, or a doctrine of logic, or respecting teachers for the mere fact that they are one's teachers. Knowledge coming from such sources is based on greed, hatred, and delusion and Buddhist devotees should consider such knowledge impartially and not blindly. However, it should not all be refuted either. They should find out whether a teaching is true by personal verification, distinguishing what leads to happiness and benefit, and what does not. Giving an example of such an approach, the Buddha states that the practice of abandoning greed, hatred, and delusion will benefit the practitioner, regardless of whether there is such a thing as karmic retribution and rebirth. Thus, personal experience and judgement are emphasized in accepting the Buddha and Buddhism. A person should, however, also heed the counsel of the wise.

In the discourse called the Canki Sutta, the Buddha points out that people's beliefs may turn out in two different ways: they might either be genuine, factual, and not mistaken; or vain, empty, and false. Thus, when a person holds a certain belief, they should not derive the conclusion "Only this is true, anything else is false," but instead "preserve the truth" with the awareness "This is my belief". Thus, the discourse criticizes, among others, divine revelation, tradition, and report, as leading to "groundless faith" and as being incomplete means of acquiring spiritual knowledge or truth. But in the Sandaka Sutta, the Buddha also criticizes mere reasoning or logic as a means of attaining to truth. Instead, personal and direct intuitive knowledge are required to attain the truth, when such knowledge is not affected by bias. Thus, belief and faith are not considered sufficient for arriving at truth, even in spiritual matters where other religious traditions would defer to faith. The Buddha does not agree with traditions that demand blind faith in scriptures or teachers. In one discourse, when asked on which authority the Buddha bases his teachings, he answers that he does not base them on tradition, faith, or reason, but rather on personal experience as a source of authority.

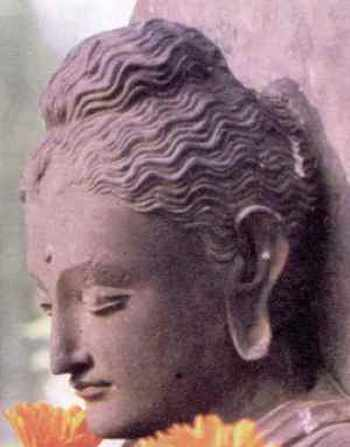
The Buddha states in several discourses, including the Vimaṁsaka Sutta, that his disciples should investigate even him as to whether he really is enlightened and pure in conduct, by observing him for a long time.

The Buddhist devotee should verify moral judgment and truth by personal experience. This leads to a provisional acceptance, called "preserving the truth". Faith goes hand-in-hand with an open attitude of willingness to learn and experiment, familiarizing oneself with the teaching. Through personal verification a person's faith deepens, ultimately changing from "preserving" to "discovering" the truth. This verification process involves ordinary experience, but also the yogic experience of cultivation of the mind. Furthermore, the Buddha applies these criteria to his own teaching: he is qualified to teach his dharma because he has verified it for himself, not learnt it from someone else or reasoned it out. The Buddha states in several discourses, including the Vimaṁsaka Sutta, that his disciples should investigate even him as to whether he really is enlightened and pure in conduct, by observing him for a long time. Several people are described in the Pāli Canon observing the Buddha in such a way, and thereby arriving at well-grounded faith. This does not mean, however, that the Buddha does not accept any acts of reverence to his person: he teaches that devotional acts can help to uplift lay practitioners' minds, and help them on the path to a better rebirth and enlightenment. Devotion is therefore a subject that requires the serious practitioner's interest.

==== As initial step ====
Faith is an initial trust in the Buddha as a spiritual teacher and an initial acceptance of the Buddha's teachings. Faith is considered of great benefit to a beginning practitioner. In the Cula-hatthipadopama Sutta, the Buddha describes the path of enlightenment as starting with faith in him, but continuing with the practise of virtue, meditation, and wisdom, culminating in the achievement of enlightenment. Thus, the initial faith provides the confidence to continue the path up unto the final aim. For this reason, in early Buddhist teachings faith is usually listed as the first quality in progressive lists of virtues.

Besides saddhā, another word, pasāda, and its related synonyms pasanna and pasīdati, are sometimes also translated as 'faith', but are given a higher value than saddhā. Saddhā deepens when someone progresses along the spiritual path, and early texts sometimes describe this as pasāda, and sometimes as bhakti. Pasāda is faith and attraction towards a teacher, but is accompanied by clarity of mind, placidity, and understanding. The practising disciple develops and stabilizes his faith, basing it on spiritual insight. This leads his faith to become "unshakeable".

Thus, faith is by itself not enough to attain deliverance, but is a first step on the path leading to wisdom and enlightenment. Many teachings in early Buddhism mention faith as the first step, wisdom as the last. On the last stage of the Buddhist path, the attainment of arahant, the practitioner has completely replaced faith by wisdom: the arahant no longer relies on faith at all, although at this stage sometimes a form of realized faith is described. Therefore, the Buddha praises most of his disciples for their wisdom, rather than their faith. The exception to that, the monk Vakkali—praised by the Buddha as "the highest of those who had faith"—is also taught by the Buddha to concentrate on the teaching, rather than the Buddha's person. The Buddha admonishes his disciple Ānanda in a similar way.

In the Pāli Canon, different approaches of faith are described. Developing faith in someone's person, even in the Buddha himself, is of little use when it is too much connected with superficial features—such as physical appearance—and too little with the Buddha's teaching. Such an approach to faith is said to lead to affection and anger and has other disadvantages. It is an impediment to walking in the steps of the Buddha and attaining enlightenment, such as in the case of Vakkali. Faith and devotion must always go hand-in-hand with a sense of equanimity.

=== Mahāyāna Buddhism ===
==== Indian Mahāyāna ====
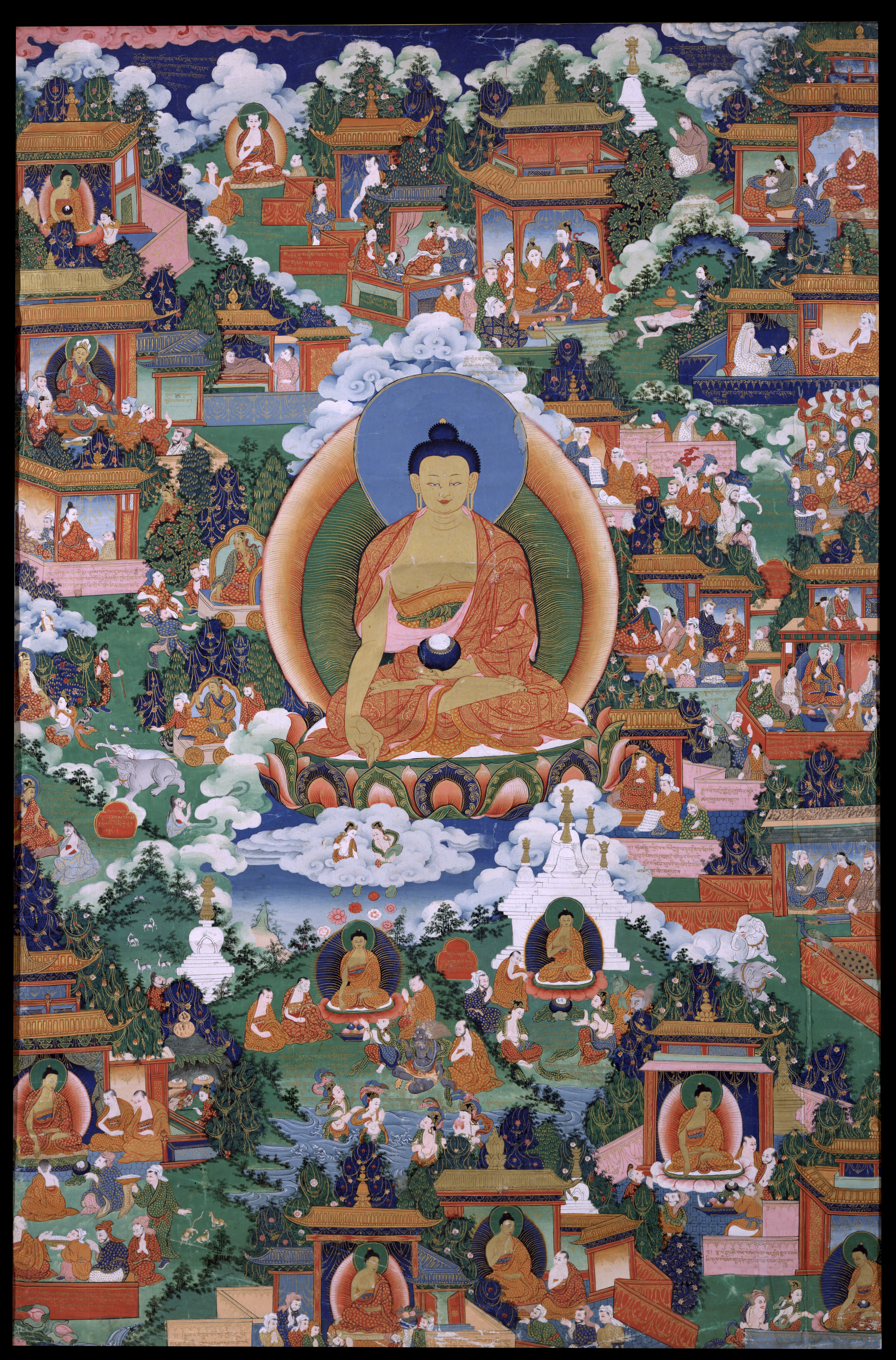
Gautama Buddha with scenes from Avadāna legends depicted

During the period of emperor Ashoka (third to second century BCE), Buddhists placed more emphasis on faith, as Ashoka helped develop Buddhism as a popular religion to unify his empire. This new trend led to an increased worship of stūpas and an increase of Avadāna faith-based literature. In the second century CE, it became more common to depict the Buddha through images, and there was a shift in emphasis in Indian religion towards a new devotionalism (bhakti). This led to a new emphasis, summarized by Buddhist studies scholar Peter Harvey as "compassion, faith, and wisdom". This paved the way to the arising of Mahāyāna Buddhism. This rise in devotionalism was also seen in non-Mahāyāna schools, including Theravāda, which began emphasizing hagiographical accounts of the Buddha and bodhisattvas. In many of these accounts the Buddha played a major role in other people's enlightenment.

The role of faith in Mahāyāna Buddhism is similar to that in Theravāda—in both, faith is an unavoidable part of practice. Even in present-day Theravāda Buddhism, originating from Pāli Buddhism, faith is important. Theravādins see faith in the Triple Gem as a protective force in daily life, especially when combined with a moral life. However, in Mahāyāna Buddhism, the depth and range of teachings on faith intensified. A great number of powerful Buddhas and bodhisattvas became the focus of devotion and faith, giving Mahāyāna Buddhism a "theistic" side. Mahāyāna Buddhism expanded on the ideas found in some early Buddhist schools which saw the Buddha as being transcendent, a view which was common in the Mahāsāṃghika schools (especially in Lokottaravāda).

After the Buddha's death, Buddhist communities felt his absence deeply, and there was a desire to "see" the Buddha (darśana) and receive his power. Mahāyāna extended the meaning of the Triple Gem to include Buddhas in other world systems and buddhafields. Many Mahāyāna sutras, like the Pure Land sutras and the Aksobhya sutras, focused their faith upon these Buddhas from other worlds, especially the Buddha Amitābha. The increased emphasis on these other Buddhas, manifesting all the time and everywhere, started to overshadow the role of Gautama Buddha in the Buddhist faith.

This new Mahāyāna faith in other Buddhas and bodhisattvas gradually led to new forms of worship. By the sixth century, depiction of bodhisattvas in Buddhist iconography had become common, such as the bodhisattva Avalokiteśvara (the bodhisattva of compassion), and Manjusri (wisdom). Accounts about the bodhisattvas and their good deeds often included actions with great stakes, and it is likely that writers meant these accounts as devotional more than exemplary.

Mahāyāna also developed a new buddhology based on the theory of the triple Buddha body (Trikaya). With the development of the various systems of Mahāyāna philosophy and buddhology, the Buddha was no longer regarded as singular historical person. Instead, he was the manifestation of an ultimate principle, the Dharmakaya.

==== East Asian Buddhism ====
East Asian Buddhism embraced the theory of original enlightenment, the idea that awakening is immanent in all beings, not something that has to be attained, but something which is discovered within. This is originally found in the Awakening of Faith in the Mahayana. East Asian Buddhism also embraced the Pure Land sutras and faith in Buddha Amitabha and his Pure land. These trends led to Pure Land Buddhism, and, within Zen Buddhism, to an emphasis on faith in our original awakened state (our buddha-nature).

Terms for faith that are primarily used in Mahāyāna Buddhism are xin (Chinese) and shin (Japanese). These terms can refer to trust, but also to an unquestioned acceptance of the object of one's devotion. They are also used, as in Chan and Zen Buddhism, with regard to a confidence that the Buddha nature (tathāgatagarbha) is within one's mind and can be seen through Zen practice. As such, Chan and Zen Buddhists consider faith as one of the "Three Essentials" in meditation practice, together with resolve and doubt.

Pure Land Buddhists, on the other hand, make a distinction between the aspect of the mind which is faithful, and which is awakened by practising devotion and humility to the Buddha Amitābha, known as xinji (Chinese) or shinjin (Japanese); and the joy and confidence of being able to meet the Buddha Amitābha, known as xinfa (Chinese) or shingyō (Japanese). Pure Land traditions describe the awakening of faith as a transcendental experience beyond time, similar to a state preceding enlightenment. In the teachings of the Japanese Pure Land teacher Shinran, such experience of faith, which he called "the Light" (kōmyō) involved devotees not only feeling completely assured about the Buddha Amitābha as to his determination and wisdom to save them, but also feeling fully reliant on Amitābha because of their personal incapacity.

==== Tiantai, Tendai, and Nichiren Buddhism ====
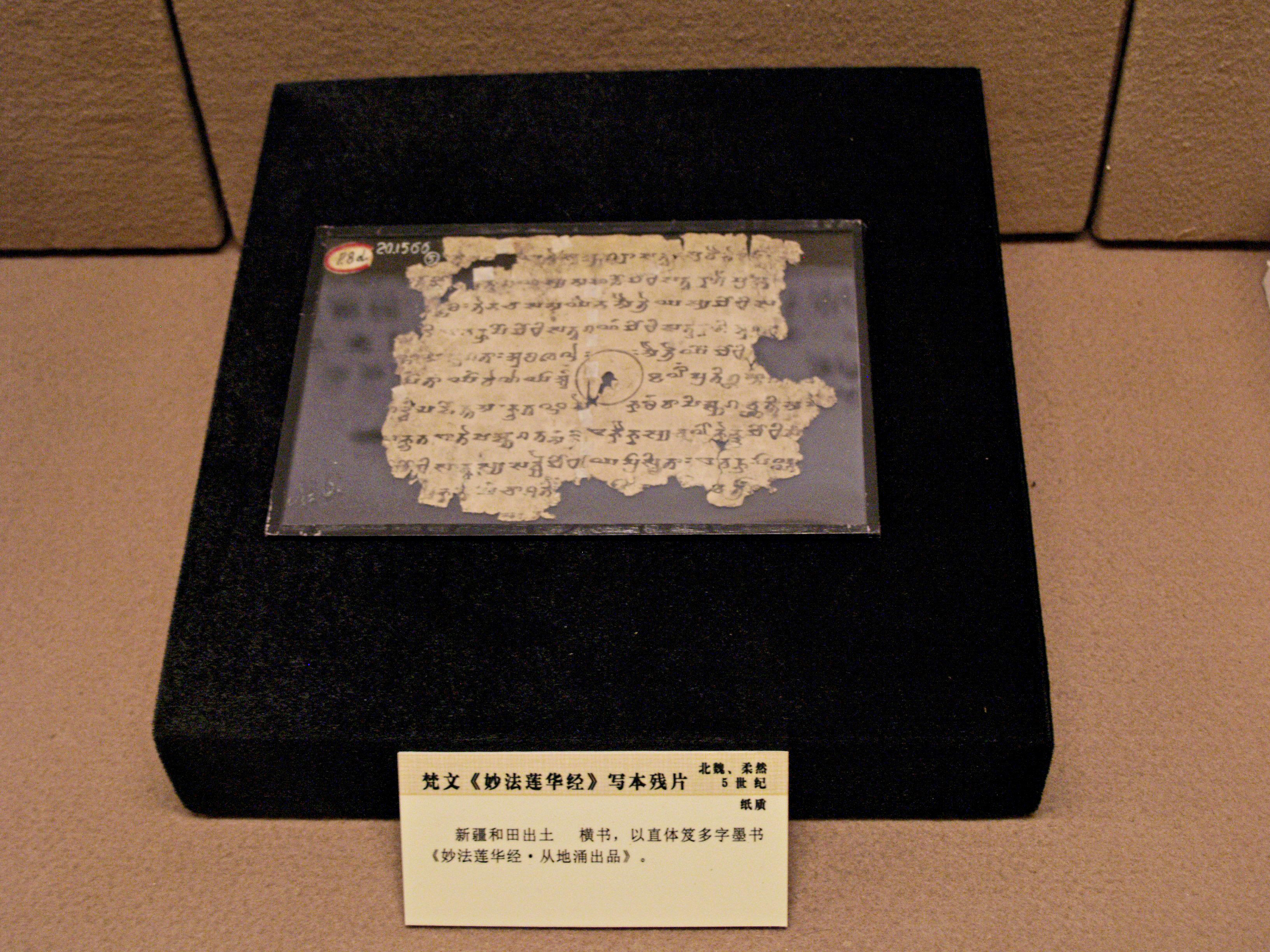
Fifth-century fragment of a Sanskrit Lotus Sutra manuscript from Rouran, Northern Wei, unearthed from Hetian, Xinjiang province. Housed in the Museum of the Mausoleum of the Nanyue King.

The Lotus Sūtra, one of the most worshiped texts (sūtra) in Southeast Asia, embraces the ideal of faith in a transcendent eternal Buddha. In medieval China and Japan, many miraculous legends were related to the Lotus Sūtra, contributing to its popularity. Scholars have suggested that the sūtra's emphasis on the Buddha as a powerful father figure has helped make the sūtra popular.

The Lotus Sūtra was composed in the first two centuries of the Common Era. Part of the "Cult of the Book", Mahāyānists substituted the worship of relic stupas with the worship of the Dharma represented in the sūtra. They honoured and worshiped the Lotus Sūtra just like many other Mahāyāna sūtras, similar to the worship of stūpas before the arising of Mahāyāna Buddhism. They worshiped the Lotus Sūtra more than most 'sūtras. The sūtra itself describes different types of devotion to it—receiving and keeping, reading, reciting, teaching, and transcribing it—and it was worshiped in a large variety of ways. In some copies, scribes depicted every letter similar to a Buddha, enshrined in a stūpa.

Although the theoretical implications of the Lotus Sūtra influenced traditional scholars, the devotional practices surrounding the sūtra affected Buddhism even more. The Chinese Tiantai school (6th century) and its later Japanese form, Tendai, further promoted worship of the Lotus Sūtra, combined with devotion toward Amitābha Buddha. These schools believe the sūtra to be supreme among all of the Buddha's teachings, and to lead to enlightenment in the present lifetime. Some schools of the Kamakura period (12th–14th century), took reverence towards the Lotus Sūtra to the extent that they saw it as the single vehicle or path of the dharma, and the Japanese teacher Nichiren (1222–82) believed only this practice led society to an ideal Buddha land.

Nichiren promoted faith in and worship of the sūtra for this reason, criticizing other schools and types of worship sharply. Seeing the sūtra as a prophecy of the mission of his own movement, Nichiren believed that through devotion to the sūtra a Pure Land on earth could be realized, one which depicts the ideal of enlightenment in Māhayāna Buddhism. He taught that worship of the sūtra led the practitioner to unite with the primordial Buddha, of whom he believed all Buddhas are manifestations. Nichiren promoted the invocation of the sutra title based "on faith alone". Despite this great devotion to the Lotus Sūtra, Nichiren de-emphasized the study of the sutra, believing that chanting the title of the sutra, was the most effective practice for people living in the "Age of Dharma Decline".

Today, more than forty organizations continue the Nichiren tradition, some of which are lay organizations.

==== Pure Land Buddhism ====
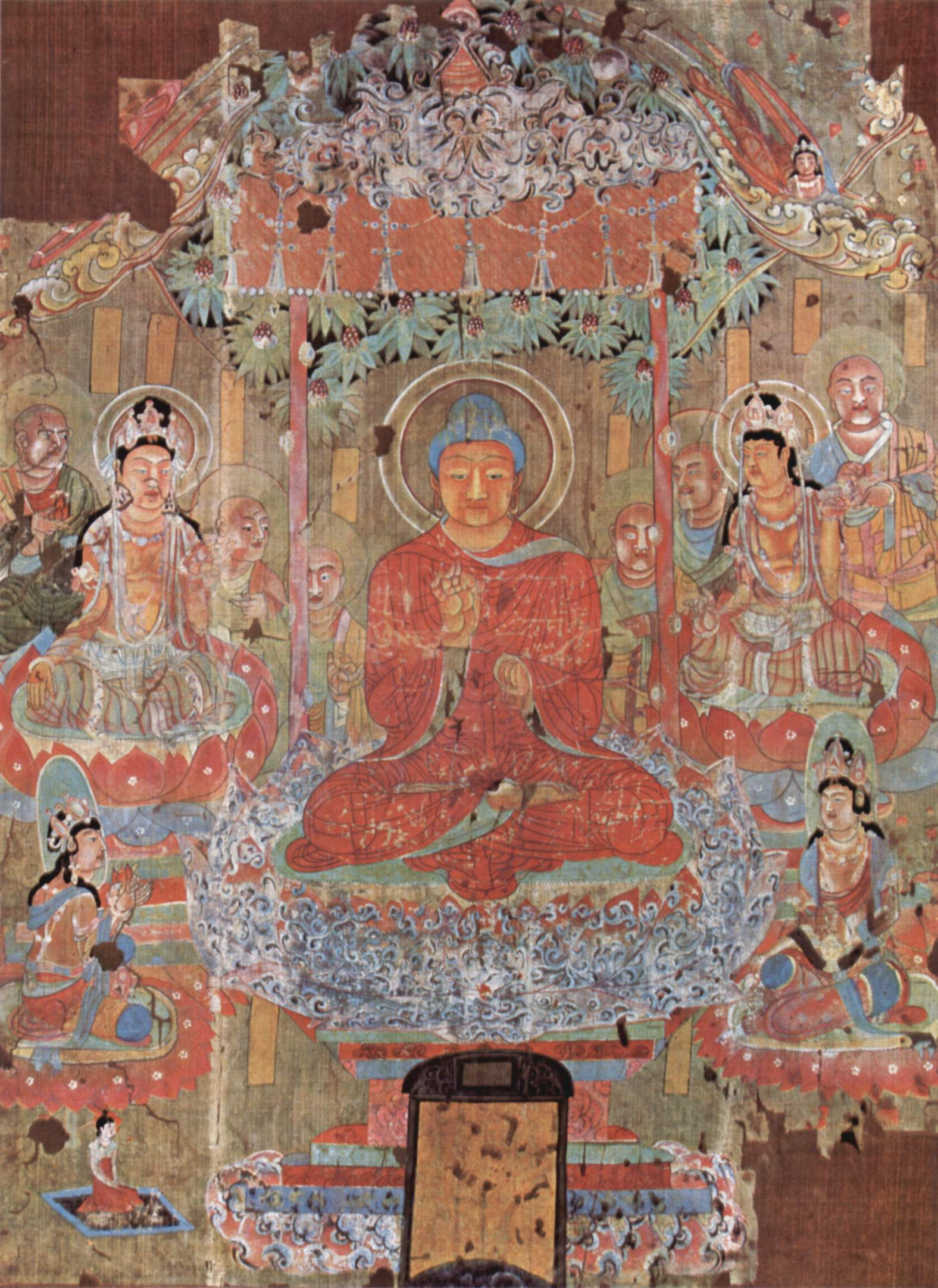
Amitābha Buddha

It is perhaps in the "Pure Land" sūtras that faith and devotion reach a pinnacle of soteriological importance. When devotion to celestial Buddhas developed in Mahāyāna Buddhism, the idea arose that these Buddhas were able to create 'Buddha-fields' (buddha-kṣetra), or Pure Lands (the central one being Amitabha's Sukhāvatī). In Pure Land Buddhism, it is one's faith in the compassionate power of the Buddha Amitābha, coupled with the earnest wish to enter his Pure Land, that is said to bring deliverance there. This Pure Land prepares the devotee for entry into awakening and Buddhahood. Pure Land Buddhism differed in many ways from most forms of Buddhism at the time, which were based on personal effort and techniques of self-mastery.

Mahāyāna Buddhists considered Amitābha (Sanskrit: 'Limitless light') as a transcendent Buddha who had created a pure divine realm. The Longer Sukhāvatīvyūha Sūtra describes the Buddha Amitābha as a monk who, practising under a Buddha in a previous age, vowed to create a land through his spiritual powers. Through this ideal land he would easily be able to guide many living beings to final enlightenment. He therefore vowed that once he had attained Buddhahood, just calling his name would be enough for living beings to be born in this Pure Land. Widespread in Japan, Korea, China, and Tibet, devotion to Amitābha arose in India around the beginning of the Common Era. Central to Pure Land Buddhism is the idea that the current age humans live in is the Age of Dharma Decline (mofa, mappō), the final stage of the current Buddha's dispensation. Pure Land Buddhists believe that in this period people are severely limited in their own capability for attaining salvation. They must therefore rely on "other power" of Amitābha to attain liberation in the Pure Land. This shared sentiment may have been due to the violent civil conflicts, famines, fires, and decay of monastic institutions. But the idea of reliance on the Buddha's power might also have been a consequence of the Mahāyāna teachings on the nature of the Buddha, which made the distance between the unenlightened and Buddhahood much greater.

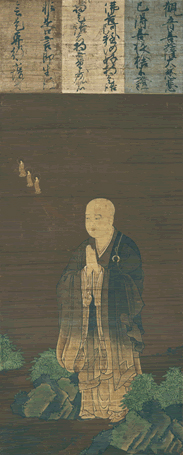
Painting of the Chinese Pure Land monk and writer Shandao

Pure Land Buddhist meditations were initially practiced by Huiyuan (334–416 CE) on Mount Lu with the founding of the White Lotus Society. The most important Pure Land master was Shandao (613–681), who emphasized the recitation of the name of the Buddha Amitābha (the practice of nianfo; Jp: nembutsu), combined with several other practices as a way for ordinary people to be reborn in the Pure Land. There were two key often opposing elements of the Pure Land faith in China, the ideals of self-power (referring to a bodhisattva's own efforts and merits) and other-power (the Buddha's vast spiritual power). Some Pure Land teachers taught that bodhisattvas relied on their own merit and power to create Pure Lands and to reach the Pure lands of the Buddhas. On the other hand, other teachers (like Shandao) emphasized that practitioners should solely rely on their devotion to the Buddha Amitabha and the "other-power" of his vows. In Japanese Pure Land Buddhism, the latter ideal became prevalent. But even in Japan, there was much debate as to what emphasis to give to the active efforts of the devotee (i.e. self power, jiriki) on the one hand, and the total reliance on Amitābha Buddha and his vow on the other hand (i.e. faith in other-power / tariki).

The other-power approach was emphasized by the Pure Land schools of the "New Kamakura Buddhism" (Jōdo-shū, Ji-shu, and Jōdo-Shinshū) which focused on faith based Pure Land practices exclusively (especially nembutsu) and appealed to many lay people. In the case of the Shin Buddhist movement (the "True Pure Land" sect), it was dominated by laypersons who met in dojos. Other schools like Tendai, Shingon and Kegon allowed for an approach which made room for self-power and numerous complex meditative practices in traditional monastic settings. These emphasized visualization more than the reciting of Amitābha Buddha's name, and emphasized enlightenment in the present lifetime more than attaining to a Pure Land after death.

Pure Land Buddhism is currently still one of the most popular forms of religion in East Asia, and is practised by most East Asian monks. As of the 1990s, the older generation of Chinese people still used the Amitābha mantra in common everyday greetings.

===== Japan =====
In Japan, the most influential figures were Hōnen (1133–1212), and his student Shinran (1173–1262). They drew on Tanluan and Shandao's works to develop a new Japanese Pure Land Buddhism which eventually grew into their own separate Pure Land schools. They believed and taught that mindfully reciting the nembutsu would be enough to secure the faithful person's entrance to Amitabha's Pure Land. Although Hōnen had initially stated that often repeating the nembutsu would make salvation more certain, Shinran argued that the number of times the nembutsu was recited did not matter (only the mind of true faith truly mattered here) and that even one utterance would be enough for salvation (ichinengi). Subsequent repetitions would be mere expressions of gratitude to Amitābha, which also held for other religious routines and practices. Shinran concluded that for a person with shinjin (the mind of true faith in the Buddha), a deep understanding of the Buddha's teachings, moral practice, and meditation did not contribute to birth in the Pure Land. He even considered some practices such as meditation as detrimental to reliance on Amitābha Buddha.

Shinran's concept of shinjin was influenced by Shandao's teaching of the "three minds": firstly, a sincere belief in the person of Amitābha Buddha; secondly, a deep trust in the vow that Amitābha Buddha had taken, and a conviction one's own low nature; and finally, a desire to dedicate the merits accrued from doing good deeds to being born in the Pure Land where Amitābha Buddha was believed to live. These three were together known as 'singleness of heart' (isshin). Shinran further taught that such full faith would assure one's birth in the Pure Land, which meant their full enlightenment would be irreversibly assured (making one equal to Maitreya).

Shinran expanded on Hōnen's teaching, focusing further on faith. Since he was convinced that he was destined to fall in hell without the help of the Buddha Amitābha, devotion to the Buddha Amitābha and trust in his vow was the single way to salvation. Whereas Hōnen had emphasized mostly devotion to the Buddha Amitābha, he did not do so exclusively: Shinran, on the other hand, taught a path of devotion to only the Buddha Amitābha. Thus, Shinran's Buddhism focused on a single faith based practice, in contrast to the many practices of early schools of Japanese Buddhism. Japanese Buddhism in the Kamakura era saw the popularization of schools which focused on or "selected" a single practice (e.g. Nichiren Buddhism). Japanese Pure Land teachers such as Shinran taught that faith in Amitabha Buddha was the only form of Buddhism that was the right path;while other forms of Buddhism were seen as ineffective for the Age of Dharma Decline. Although early Buddhism already emphasized letting-go of self-conceit by practising the dharma, in the later Pure Land tradition this was drawn further by stating that people should give up all "self-power" and let the power of Amitābha do the work of attaining salvation for them. This power was even believed to transcend the law of karma. Moreover, whereas Honen had taught faith could be built up by constantly reciting the nembutsu, Shinran held that faith could not be developed by practice since it was a gift granted by the grace of Amitabha Buddha. Another characteristic of the movement was its democratic nature: in some passages Shinran stated that "wicked" people have just as much chance of attaining to the Pure Land as "good" people, an idea similar to the Christian concept of "salvation of sinners". (Note: However, some scholars have downplayed the role of new movements like Pure Land Buddhism in the Kamakura period, stating that reform also took place in old Buddhist schools, and that some of the new movements only gained significance much later.)

The old Buddhist orders condemned the movement for starting a new school, distorting Buddhist teachings, and reviling Gautama Buddha. When the emperor felt that some of Hōnen's monastics acted inappropriately, Hōnen was banished to a remote province for four years. When Shinran started to teach against the custom of celibacy, stating it indicated a lack of trust in Amitābha Buddha, he was banished as well. Apart from Shinran, other priests who emphasized faith in their interpretations were also banished, as their teachings were often embraced by a following which did not accept the authority of the aristocrats in power.

In the fifteenth century, Rennyo (1415–99) was responsible for popularizing Jōdo Shinshū widely and reforming its institutions. Today, Shinshū is the most popular and largest Buddhist sect in Japan, with numerous denominations, the largest ones being direct descendants of Rennyo's Hongan-ji sect.

==== Zen Buddhism ====
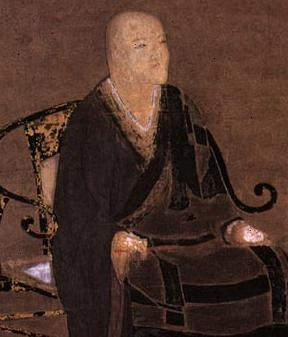
Painting of Dōgen, a Japanese Zen teacher

As with Jōdo Shinshu, some forms of Zen Buddhism arose as a reaction to Tendai Buddhism. And like Pure Land Buddhism, faith also played a role in Sōtō Zen. This form of Zen, also known as "farmer's Zen" because of its popularity in agrarian society, was developed by Dōgen (1200–53). Apart from the focus on meditation practice which was common in Zen Buddhism, Dōgen led a revival of interest in the study of the sūtras, which he taught would inspire to a faith based on understanding. Inspired by Chinese Chan Buddhism, Dōgen was attracted to a return of the simple life as exemplified by the Buddha in the sūtras. He further believed that sitting meditation was not only the path to enlightenment, but also a way to express the Buddha nature within. The practitioner should have the faith that the Buddha nature is already within, Dōgen taught, although Dōgen did not believe this was in the form of a permanent self. Dōgen believed enlightenment was possible in this life—even the secular life—and he did not believe in the idea of the Age of Dharma Decline.

==== Avalokiteśvara ====
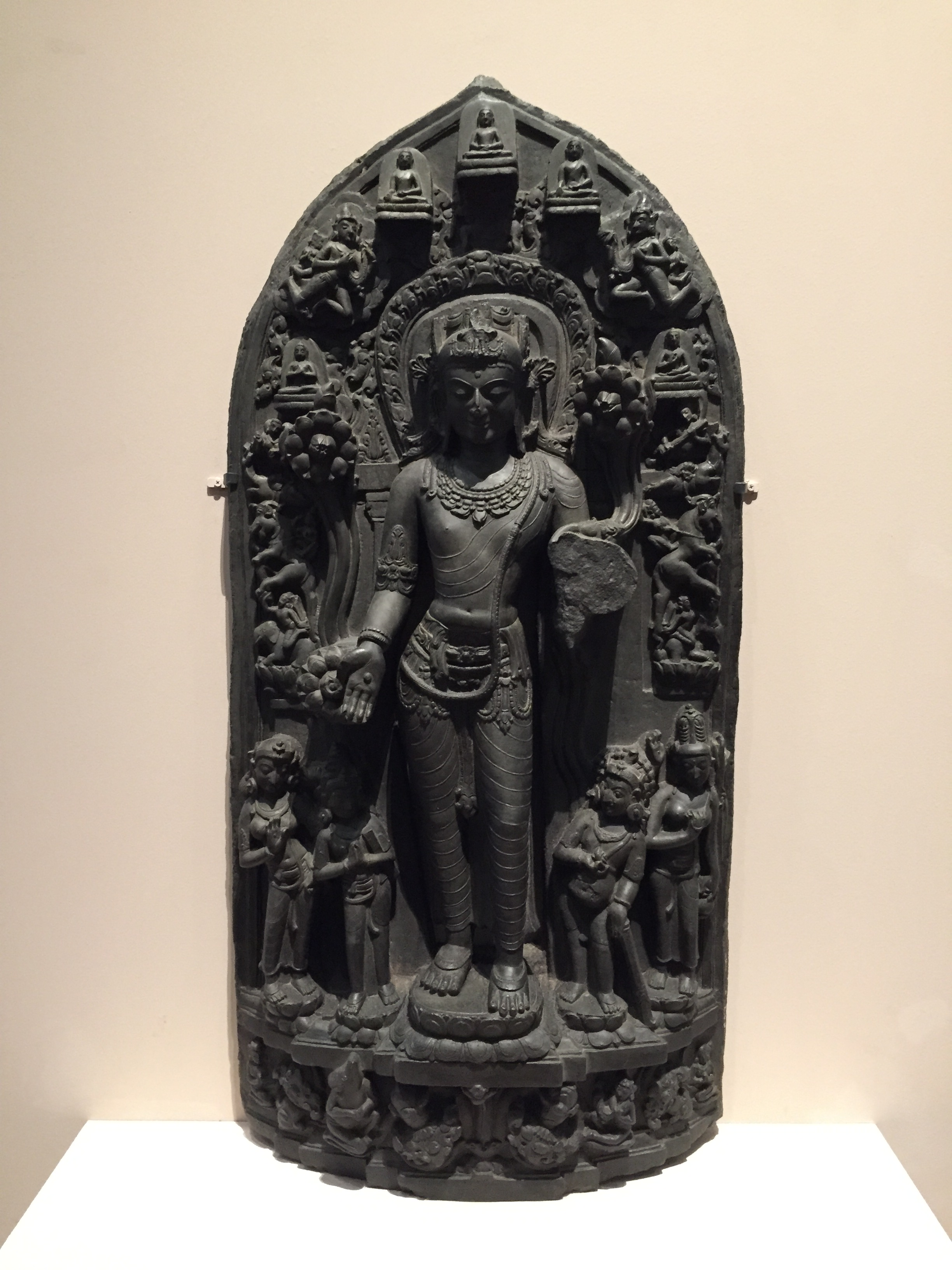
Sculpture of Avalokiteśvara, with the five Celestial Buddhas on the top outer edge

In East Asian Buddhism, there has been a strong focus on worship of the bodhisattva Avalokiteśvara. His cult originated in the northern borders of India, but he has been honoured for his compassion in many countries, such as China, Tibet, Japan, Sri Lanka, and other parts of Southeast Asia, and among diverse levels of society.

The text called the Avalokiteśvara Sūtra states that Avalokiteśvara will help anyone who speaks his name with faith, fulfilling many kinds of wishes, and awakening people to their compassionate Buddha nature. Avalokiteśvara is strongly connected to the Buddha Amitābha, as it is believed that he lives in the same Pure Land, and will come to the rescue of those who invoke the name of the Buddha Amitābha. Focusing on both mundane benefits and salvation, devotion to Avalokiteśvara was promoted through the spread of the Lotus Sūtra, which includes a chapter about him, as well as through the Perfection of Wisdom sūtras. Avalokiteśvara's devotees often depict him as a female, and in this female form she is known as Guanyin in China, originating from an association with the female Buddhist deity Tārā. Avalokiteśvara and his female form Guanyin are among the most depicted figures in Buddhism, and Guanyin is also worshiped by Daoists.

=== Other historical developments ===
==== Deities ====
In Buddhism, Buddhas and other enlightened beings are the main focus of honour, comparable to gods in other religions. Although Buddhism does recognize the existence of deities, Buddhas and other enlightened beings are considered to be different, in that they are seen as outside of the cycle of existence. This does not mean that worship of deities did not exist in Buddhism. However, worship of deities has often been considered a form of superstition or a form of skillful means to guide the unenlightened to a better life, and not much more than that.

In the history of the diffusion of Buddhism, the relation between Buddhism and local deities was an important aspect of its success, but Buddhists have often denied this because of local movements for orthodoxy. Furthermore, scholars have paid little interest to the role of local deities, since it is not covered by any of the standard academic disciplines studying Buddhism, such as Buddhist studies or anthropology. Nevertheless, deities had a role in Buddhist cosmology from its early days. Buddhist traditions saw them, however, as subordinate to the Buddha, and related many stories of them embracing the Buddhist teaching and even becoming protectors of it. When Buddhist teachers adopted existing cosmologies, but placed the Buddha on top of these systems, a Buddhist cosmology arose. Part of this process was depicting these deities as violent and disorganized, in contrast to Buddhism and its practitioners—this was not far from the truth, as Buddhist missionaries often came from more ordered and less violent cultures. In this way snake-like deities (nāga), bird-like deities, and violent spirits, which previously were the focus of pre-Buddhist cults, became guardians of the Buddhist teaching. This process of adopting deities into Buddhism often occurred when Buddhist devotees or monks did not fully renounce their former devotions when embracing Buddhism. In the early Pāli scriptures, as well as in some customs in traditional Buddhist societies, traces can still be found of the period during which Buddhism competed with nāga worship and assimilated some of its features.

In some Buddhist countries, like Japan, a perspective arose of the human world as a microcosm of the macrocosmic realms of the Buddhas. This allowed for an increased tolerance of local traditions and folk religion, which were seen as connected with this macrocosmos, and thus part of Buddhism. All of these developments led Buddhism to include many deities into its system of faith, but each deity was given his place and role, subordinate to the Buddha. Even the exclusive Jōdo Shinshu taught to not denigrate the worship of Shinto deities called kami, though the school did not allow their worship either. Furthermore, in many Buddhist countries ritual specialists of pre-Buddhist traditions were given a duty beside Buddhist monks. These specialists were usually laypeople, who performed these functions in addition to their normal lay life.

Buddhism did not only appropriate deities into the religion, but also adapted its own teachings. According to religious studies scholar Donald Swearer, bodhisattvas, relic worship, and hagiographies of Buddhist masters were ways for Buddhism to adapt to pre-Buddhist deities and animistic beliefs, by fitting these into the Buddhist thought system. East Asian Buddhist movements like the Chinese White Lotus were transformations of such animistic beliefs. Such transformation of pre-Buddhist beliefs also explains the popularity of movements like Japanese Pure Land Buddhism under Hōnen and Shinran, even though in their teachings they opposed animism.

==== Millenarianism ====
Buddhism is the strongest non-western form of millenarianism. In many Buddhist traditions, there is a concept of a time when the world will end. The concept of a millenarian figure arising in the world at an apocalyptic age exists in many Buddhist traditions. In Buddhism, the growth and decline of the world is believed to come in cycles, and the declining period is believed to end with the arising of the cakravartin, and finally, the coming of the future Buddha who will start a new prosperous period. Devotion to such a messianic Buddha figure has been part of almost every Buddhist tradition. Millenarian movements are typically a form of cultural defiance of the dominant culture, resisting "the attempt to put reason and logic over faith", according to political scientist William Miles.

East Asian traditions especially associated the end of the world with the coming of the future Buddha, that is Maitreya. Early Theravada Pāli texts only briefly mention him, but he features prominently in early Buddhist schools like the Mahāsāṃghika. China, Burma, and Thailand came to honour him as part of millenarian movements, and they believed that Maitreya Buddha would arise, during times of suffering and crisis, to usher in a new era of happiness. From the fourteenth century onward, White Lotus sectarianism arose in China, which encompassed beliefs in the coming of Maitreya during an apocalyptic age. Devotees of White Lotus societies believed that their faith in the correct teachings would save them when the new world era would come. White Lotus millenarian beliefs would prove persistent, and survived into the nineteenth century, when the Chinese associated the coming of Maitreya's age with political revolution. But the nineteenth century had not been the first century in which millenarian beliefs sparked political changes: during most of China's history, faith in and worship of Maitreya Buddha often inspired rebellions to change society for the better, to await Maitreya. Some of these rebellions led to revolutions and the destruction of royal dynasties. Nevertheless, faith in the coming of a new era of Maitreya was not just political propaganda to incite rebellion, but was, in the words of Chinese Studies scholar Daniel Overmyer, "rooted in continuously existing cultic life."

In Japan, millenarian trends can be observed in the idea of the Age of Dharma Decline, which was most prominent in Nichiren Buddhism. However, more full-fledged forms of millenarianism developed from the nineteenth century onward, with the arising of new religions.

=== Modern developments ===
==== Buddhist modernism ====
Although in pre-modern times some schools of Buddhism de-emphasized faith in Buddhist practice, the role of faith really was only criticized widely in modern times. During the eighteenth century Enlightenment, western intellectuals came to see religion as culturally relative, in opposition to a single truth discernible through reason. By the end of the nineteenth century, this view on religion had informed how the West responded to Buddhism. Western writers such as Edwin Arnold began to present Buddhism as the answer to the contradiction between science and religion, as a rational religion unburdened by culture. As western science and rationalism spread to Asia, intellectuals in Asian countries such as in Sri Lanka developed similar ideas. Because of the threat from colonial powers and Christianity, and the rise of an urban middle class, at the end of the nineteenth century Sri Lankan Buddhism started to change. In a movement described by present-day scholars as "Buddhist modernism" or "protestant Buddhism", westerners and British-educated Sri Lankans advocated Buddhism as a rational philosophy, free from blind faith and idolatry, congruent with science and modern ideas. They saw traditional practices such as relic worship and other devotional routines as corruptions of an ideal, rational form of Buddhism, while assimilating Victorian and other modern values and designating them as traditional Buddhist, often without awareness of their roots.

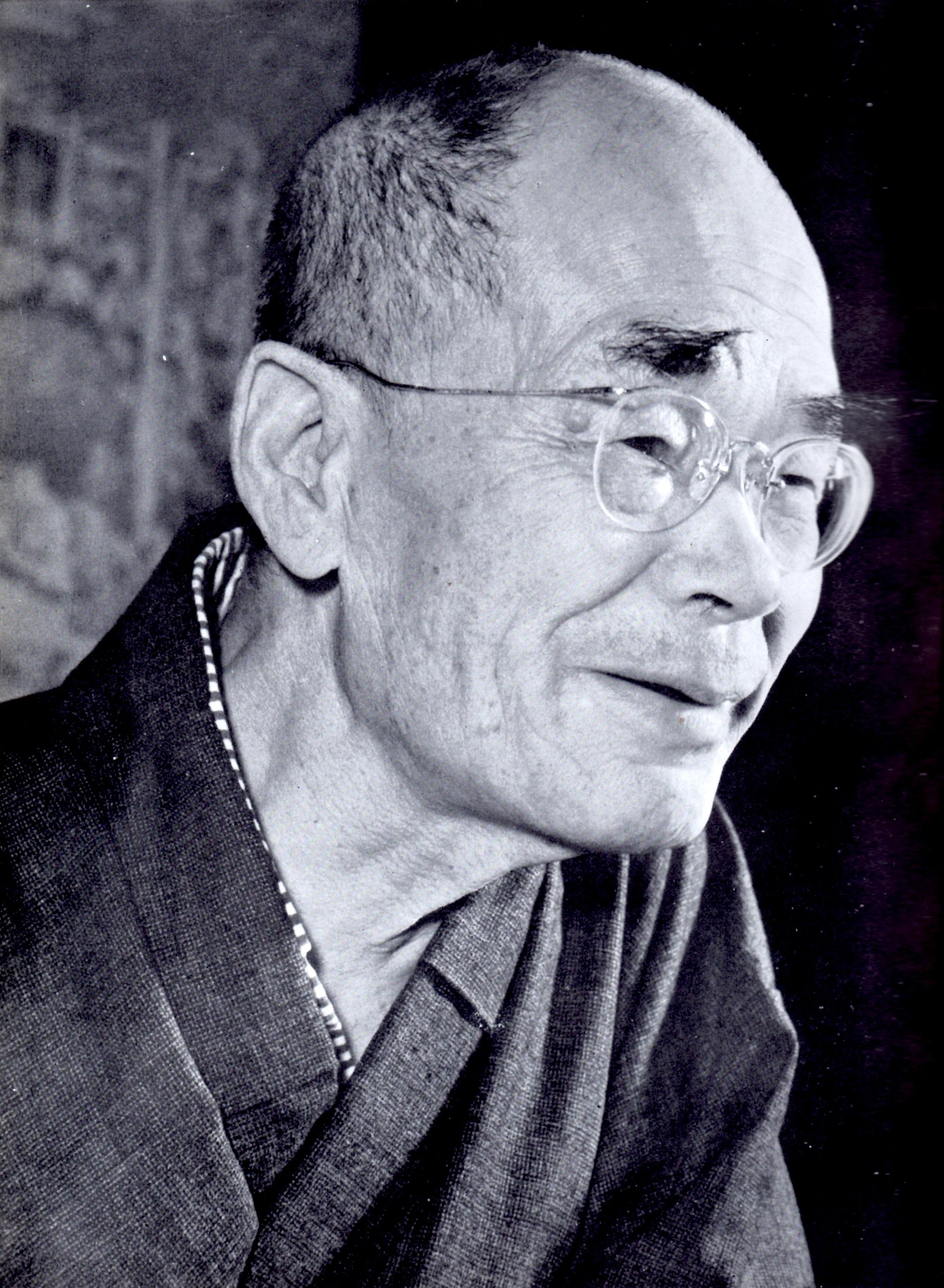
Daisetsu Teitarō Suzuki, as photographed by Shigeru Tamura

From the Meiji period onward, Buddhism in Japan was attacked as a foreign and superstitious belief system. In response to this, Buddhist schools such as Zen developed a movement called "New Buddhism" (shin bukkyo), which emphasized rationalism, modernism, and warrior ideals.

In Japanese Buddhism in the twentieth century, a critical response to traditional Buddhism arose, led by the two academics Hakamaya Noriaki and Matsumoto Shirō, called Critical Buddhism. Noriaki and Shirō's school of thought criticized Chinese and Japanese Buddhist ideas for undermining critical thinking, promoting blind faith, and laxity in improving society. East Asian Studies scholar Peter Gregory comments, however, that the attempt of Critical Buddhists to find a pure, unadulterated Buddhism, ironically, reeks of the same essentialism it criticizes. Other scholars have made similar arguments. Critical Buddhism criticizes blind faith and a belief in the Buddha Nature, but it does reserve a place for faith: Buddhist faith, states Noriaki, is the uncompromising critical capacity to distinguish between true and false Buddhism, and to commit to what is true Buddhism. Noriaki contrasts such true faith with the Japanese ideal of harmony (wa), which he believes goes hand-in-hand with uncritical acceptance of non-Buddhist ideals, including violence.

Despite these widespread modernist trends in Asia, scholars have also observed decline of rationalism and resurfacing of pre-modern religious teachings and practices: From the 1980s onward, they observed that in Sri Lankan Buddhism devotional religiosity, magical practices, honouring deities, and moral ambiguity had become more widespread, as the effects of "protestant Buddhism" were becoming weaker. Richard Gombrich and anthropologist Gananath Obeyesekere have therefore spoken of post-protestant Buddhism to describe this trend.

==== Twentieth-century Buddhism in the West ====
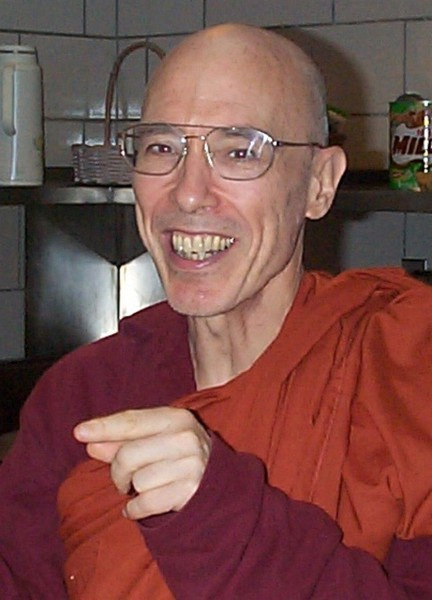
Bhikkhu Bodhi

With the spread of Buddhism to the West in the twentieth century, devotional practices still played an important role among Asian ethnic communities, though much less so in Western "convert" communities. The influence of Buddhist modernism could also be felt in the West, where lay-led organizations often offered meditation courses without much emphasis on devotion. Writers like D. T. Suzuki described meditation as a trans-cultural and non-religious practice, which appealed to westerners (though Suzuki made a point in some of hi writings that Zen could not be separated from Buddhism). Thus, in Western, secular Buddhism, meditation was more emphasized than in traditional Buddhist communities, and faith or devotion less. Just like in modern Asia, the rational and intellectual aspects of Buddhism were mostly emphasized in the West, and Buddhism was often favourably compared on this point with Christianity. The author and Buddhist teacher Stephen Batchelor, for example, advocates a form of Buddhism he believes to be original, ancient Buddhism, as it was before it became "institutionalized as a religion".

In contrast to these typical modernist trends, some western Buddhist communities show great commitment to their practice and belief, and for that reason are more traditionally religious than most forms of New Age spirituality. Furthermore, several Buddhist teachers have spoken out against interpretations of Buddhism that do away with all faith and devotion, including translator and monastic Bhikkhu Bodhi. Bhikkhu Bodhi argues that many Westerners have misunderstood the Kalāma Sutta, as Buddhism teaches that faith and personal verification should go hand-in-hand, and faith should not be discarded.

In the latter part of the twentieth century, for the first time since Buddhism left India, many Buddhist traditions are able to communicate in the same language. This has led to an increased eclecticism between the different traditions. Furthermore, with the increase of scientific research in meditation methods, prominent Buddhist authors are pointing to scientific evidence to verify whether Buddhist practice is really effective or not, rather than referring to scriptural or monastic authority.

==== Navayāna ====
In 1956, the Indian dalit (untouchable) and icon Ambedkar (1891–1956) led a mass conversion to Buddhism, starting a new Buddhist movement (Navayāna). This new movement led to a pattern of mass conversions, some of them reaching up to 500,000 people, simultaneously converting. Dalits who were dissatisfied with the Indian caste system took refuge in Buddhism as a way out. In the 2010s, violent incidents affecting dalits led to a revival of mass conversions in Gujarat and other states. Some converts admit that the conversion is a political choice to reorganize themselves, as conversion could help them to no longer be classified by the caste system.

Scholars have described Ambedkar's perspective on Buddhism as secular and modernist rather than religious, as he emphasized the atheist aspects of Buddhism and rationality, and rejected Hindu soteriology and hierarchy. Other scholars have interpreted Ambedkarism as a form of critical traditionalism, in which Ambedkar reinterprets traditional Hindu concepts rather than rejecting them altogether. Specifically, scholar Gauri Viswanathan states that Ambedkar's dalit conversions give belief a more central, worldly role than it had before. Cross-cultural researcher Ganguly Debjani, however, points at religious elements in Ambedkar's description of the Buddha's life and teaching, and states that Ambedkar deifies the Buddha as the "fount of Rationality". Several scholars have argued that the Buddha and Ambedkar are honoured by his followers through traditional devotional practices (bhakti), such as story-telling, songs and poetry, festivals, and images, despite Ambedkar's rejection of such practices.

== See also ==
- Faith in Christianity
- Faith in the Bahá'í Faith
- Faith in Nyingma Buddhist Dharma

== Sources ==
- Abe, Masao. "Buddhism in Japan". In Carr & Mahalingam (1997), pp. 675–719.
- Ahn, Juhn. "Popular conceptions of Zen". In Buswell (2004).
- Andrews, Allan A. (1993). "Lay and Monastic Forms of Pure Land Devotionalism: Typology and History". Numen. 40 (1): 16–37. doi:10.2307/3270396. JSTOR 3270396.
- Andrews, Allen A. "Hōnen". In Jones (2005f).
- Araki, Michio. "Buddhism, Schools of: Japanese Buddhism". In Jones (2005b), pp. 1241–46.
- Barber, A.W. "Pure Land Schools". In Buswell (2004), pp. 706–09.
- Barua, B.M. (1931). "Faith in Buddhism" (PDF). In Law, B.C. (ed.). Buddhistic studies. Thacker's Indian Directory. pp. 329–49. OCLC 701790696.
- Baumann, Martin. "Buddhism: Buddhism in the West". In Jones (2005b), pp. 1186–2292.
- Bielefeldt, Carl. "Japan". In Buswell (2004), pp. 384–91.
- Birnbaum, Raoul. "Avalokiteśvara". In Jones (2005b), pp. 704–07.
- Bishop, John (2016). "Faith". In Zalta, Edward N. (ed.). The Stanford Encyclopedia of Philosophy (Winter 2016 ed.). Metaphysics Research Lab, Stanford University. Archived from the original on 2018-01-20.
- Blakkarly, Jarni (5 November 2014). "The Buddhist Leap of Faith". ABC Religion and Ethics. Archived from the original on 2017-07-27.
- Bloom, Alfred. "Shinran". In Jones (2005l).
- Buswell, Robert E. Jr., ed. (2004). Encyclopedia of Buddhism (PDF). New York [u.a.]: Macmillan Reference USA, Thomson Gale. ISBN 978-0-02-865720-2. Archived from the original (PDF) on 2018-06-29.
- Buswell, Robert E. Jr.; Lopez, Donald S. Jr. (2013). Princeton Dictionary of Buddhism. Princeton, NJ: Princeton University Press. ISBN 978-0-691-15786-3.
- Cabezón, José Ignacio. "Scripture". In Buswell (2004).
- Carr, Brian; Mahalingam, Indira, eds. (1997). Companion encyclopedia of Asian philosophy (PDF). London: Routledge. ISBN 978-0-415-03535-4. Archived (PDF) from the original on 2017-07-30.
- Contursi, Janet A. (1989). "Militant Hindus and Buddhist Dalits: Hegemony and Resistance in an Indian Slum". American Ethnologist. 16 (3): 441–457. doi:10.1525/ae.1989.16.3.02a00020. JSTOR 645267.
- Conze, Edward (2003) [1951]. Buddhism, its essence and development. Mineola, N.Y.: Dover Publications. ISBN 978-0-486-43095-9. Archived from the original on 2017-11-22.
- Cousins, L.S. (1997). "Aspects of Esoteric Southern Buddhism". In Connolly, P.; Hamilton, S. (eds.). Indian Insights: Buddhism, Brahmanism and Bhakti: Papers from the Annual Spalding Symposium on Indian Religions. Luzac Oriental. Archived from the original on 2017-11-22.
- Dennis, Mark. "Buddhism, Schools of: East Asian Buddhism". In Jones (2005b), p. 1250.
- Derris, Karen. "Buddhas and Bodhisattvas: Ethical practices". In Jones (2005b), p. 1084.
- De Silva, Lily (2002). "Faith". In Malalasekera, Gunapala Piyasena (ed.). Encyclopaedia of Buddhism. Vol. V. Government of Ceylon.
- Dobbins, James C. (2002). Jodo Shinshu: Shin Buddhism in medieval Japan. Honolulu: University of Hawaii Press. ISBN 978-0-8248-2620-8.
- Dobbins, James C. "Kamakura Buddhism, Japan". In Buswell (2004), pp. 411–15.
- Dore, Bhavya (1 October 2016). "Rising caste-related violence pushes many Indians to new faith". Houston Chronicle. Religion News Service. Hearst Newspapers. Archived from the original on 2017-09-24.
- DuBois, Thomas. "Millenarianism and millenarian movements". In Buswell (2004), pp. 537–40.
- Emmanuel, Steven M., ed. (2013). A companion to Buddhist philosophy (PDF). Chichester, West Sussex: Wiley-Blackwell. ISBN 978-0-470-65877-2. Archived from the original (PDF) on 2017-03-12.
- Ergardt, Jan T. (1977). Faith and Knowledge in Early Buddhism. Leiden: E.J. Brill. ISBN 9004048413.
- Findly, Ellison Banks (1992). "Ānanda's Hindrance: Faith (Saddha) in early Buddhism". Journal of Indian Philosophy. 20 (3): 253–73. doi:10.1007/bf00157758. S2CID 169332149.
- Findly, Ellison Banks (2003). Dāna: giving and getting in Pali Buddhism. Buddhist Traditions. Vol. 52. Delhi: Motilal Banarsidass Publishers. ISBN 978-81-208-1956-6.
- Ford, J.L. (2006). Jōkei and Buddhist Devotion in Early Medieval Japan. Oxford University Press. ISBN 978-0-19-972004-0.
- Fuller, Paul (2004). The notion of diṭṭhi in Theravāda Buddhism : the point of view. London: RoutledgeCurzon. ISBN 978-0-203-01043-3.
- Ganguly, Debjani (7 August 2006). "Buddha, Bhakti and Superstition: A Post-secular Reading of Dalit Conversion". Postcolonial Studies. 7 (1): 49–62. doi:10.1080/1368879042000210621. S2CID 144474550.
- Getz, Daniel A. "Pure Land Buddhism". In Buswell (2004), pp. 698–703.
- Giustarini, G. (2006). "Faith and renunciation in Early Buddhism: saddhā and nekkhamma". Rivista di Studi Sudasiatici. 1 (I): 162. doi:10.13128/RISS-2451.
- Glassman, Hank. "Sexuality". In Buswell (2004).
- Gokhale-Tuerner, J.B. (1980). "'Bhakti' or 'Vidroha': Continuity and Change in Dalit Sahitya". Journal of Asian and African Studies. 15 (1).
- Gombrich, Richard; Obeyesekere, Gananath (1990). Buddhism transformed: religious change in Sri Lanka. Delhi: Motilal Banarsidass. ISBN 978-8120807020.
- Gombrich, Richard F. (1995). Buddhist precept and practice: traditional Buddhism in the rural highlands of Ceylon. London [u.a.]: Kegan Paul. ISBN 978-0-7103-0444-5.
- Gombrich, Richard F. (2006). Theravāda Buddhism: a social history from ancient Benares to modern Colombo (2nd ed.). London [u.a.]: Routledge. ISBN 978-0-415-36508-6.
- Gombrich, Richard F. (2006b). How Buddhism began: the conditioned genesis of the early teachings (2nd ed.). London: Routledge. CiteSeerX 10.1.1.694.6690. ISBN 978-0-415-37123-0.
- Gombrich, Richard F. (2009). What the Buddha thought. London [u.a.]: Equinox Publishing. ISBN 978-1-84553-612-1.
- Gómez, Luis O. (2004a). "Amitābha". In Buswell (2004), pp. 14–15.
- Gómez, Luis O. (2004b). "Faith". In Buswell (2004), pp. 277–79.
- Green, Ronald S. "East Asian Buddhism". In Emmanuel (2013).
- Gregory, P.N. (1997). "Is Critical Buddhism Really Critical?" (PDF). Pruning the Bodhi Tree: The Storm Over Critical Buddhism. Archived (PDF) from the original on 2016-08-17.
- Gummer, Natalie. "Buddhist books and texts: Ritual uses of books". In Jones (2005b).
- Harvey, Peter (2000). An Introduction to Buddhist Ethics: Foundations, Values and Issues (PDF). New York: Cambridge University Press. ISBN 978-0-511-07584-1. Archived from the original (PDF) on 2016-01-28.
- Harvey, Peter. "Dukkha, non-self, and the "Four Noble Truths"". In Emmanuel (2013).
- Harvey, Peter (2013b). An introduction to Buddhism: teachings, history and practices (2nd ed.). New York: Cambridge University Press. ISBN 978-0-521-85942-4.
- Higham, Charles F.W. (2004). Encyclopedia of ancient Asian civilizations (PDF). New York: Facts On File. ISBN 978-0-8160-4640-9.
- Hirota, Dennis (2022). "Japanese Pure Land Philosophy". In Zalta, Edward N. (ed.). The Stanford Encyclopedia of Philosophy (Winter 2016 ed.). Metaphysics Research Lab, Stanford University. Archived from the original on 2017-12-11.
- Hoffmann, Frank J. (1987). "The pragmatic efficacy of "Saddha"". Journal of Indian Philosophy. 15 (4): 399–412. doi:10.1007/BF00178816. ISSN 1573-0395. S2CID 144431803.
- Holder, John J. "A survey of early Buddhist epistemology". In Emmanuel (2013).
- Hsieh, Ding-hwa (2009). "Buddhism, Pure Land". In Cheng, Linsun; Brown, Kerry (eds.). Berkshire encyclopedia of China. Great Barrington, MA: Berkshire Publishing Group. ISBN 978-0-9770159-4-8.
- Hudson, Clarke. "Buddhist meditation: East Asian Buddhist meditation". In Jones (2005b), pp. 1290–95.
- Irons, Edward A. (2008). Encyclopedia of Buddhism. Encyclopedia of World Religions. New York: Facts on File. ISBN 978-0-8160-5459-6.
- Irons, Edward A. (2010). "Statues-Buddhist" (PDF). In Melton, J. Gordon; Baumann, Martin (eds.). Religions of the world (2nd ed.). Santa Barbara, CA: ABC-CLIO. p. 2721. ISBN 978-1-59884-204-3. Archived from the original (PDF) on 2017-03-21.
- Jackson, Roger R. "Buddhism in India". In Carr & Mahalingam (1997).
- Jayatilleke, K.N. (1963). Early Buddhist theory of knowledge. George Allen & Unwin. ISBN 978-1-134-54287-1.
- Jones, Lindsay, ed. (2005b). Encyclopedia of religion (PDF). Vol. 2 (2nd ed.). Detroit: Thomson Gale. ISBN 978-0-02-865997-8. Archived from the original (PDF) on 2017-03-02.
- Jones, Lindsay, ed. (2005e). Encyclopedia of religion (PDF). Vol. 5 (2nd ed.). Detroit: Thomson Gale. ISBN 978-0-02-865738-7. Archived from the original (PDF) on 2017-05-05.
- Jones, Lindsay, ed. (2005f). Encyclopedia of religion (PDF). Vol. 6 (2nd ed.). Detroit: Thomson Gale. ISBN 978-0-02-865739-4. Archived from the original (PDF) on 2017-05-05.
- Jones, Lindsay, ed. (2005g). Encyclopedia of religion (PDF). Vol. 7 (2nd ed.). Detroit: Thomson Gale. ISBN 978-0-02-865740-0. Archived from the original (PDF) on 2017-05-05.
- Jones, Lindsay, ed. (2005k). Encyclopedia of religion (PDF). Vol. 11 (2nd ed.). Detroit: Thomson Gale. ISBN 978-0-02-865980-0. Archived from the original (PDF) on 2017-03-02.
- Jones, Lindsay, ed. (2005l). Encyclopedia of religion (PDF). Vol. 12 (2nd ed.). Detroit: Thomson Gale. ISBN 978-0-02-865981-7. Archived from the original (PDF) on 2017-03-02.
- Kalupahana, David J. (1976). Buddhist Philosophy: A Historical Analysis. Honolulu: University of Hawaii Press. ISBN 978-0-8248-0360-5.
- Kariyawasam, A.G.S. (1995). "Buddhist Ceremonies and Rituals of Sri Lanka". The Wheel. 402/404. Kandy, Sri Lanka: Buddhist Publication Society. Archived from the original on 2013-03-28.
- Kinnard, Jacob N. "Worship". In Buswell (2004), pp. 905–07.
- Kiyota, Minoru (1985). "Tathāgatagarbha Thought: A Basis of Buddhist Devotionalism in East Asia". Japanese Journal of Religious Studies. 12 (2/3): 207–231. doi:10.18874/jjrs.12.2-3.1985.207-231. JSTOR 30233958. Archived from the original on 2016-03-20.
- Kotatsu, Fujita. "Pure and Impure Lands". In Jones (2005k).
- Lai, Whalen W. (1981). "The Predocetic "Finite Buddhakāya" in the Lotus Sūtra: In Search of the Illusive Dharmakāya Therein". Journal of the American Academy of Religion. 49 (3): 447–69. doi:10.1093/jaarel/XLIX.3.447.
- Lamotte, Etienne (1988). Histoire du Bouddhisme Indien, des origines à l'ère Śaka [History of Indian Buddhism: from the origins to the Saka era] (in French). Translated by Webb-Boin, Sara. Louvain-la-Neuve: Université catholique de Louvain, Institut orientaliste. ISBN 978-9068311006.
- Landes, Richard A., ed. (2000). Encyclopedia of Millennialism and Millennial Movements (PDF). Hoboken: Taylor & Francis. ISBN 978-0-203-00943-7. Archived from the original on 2017-12-01.
- Landes, Richard A. (2000a). "Millennialism in the Western World". In Landes (2000).
- Lazich, Michael C. "Asia". In Landes (2000), pp. 64–71.
- Leaman, Oliver (2000). Eastern philosophy: key readings. London [u.a.]: Routledge. ISBN 978-0-415-17357-5.
- McMahan, David L. (2008). The Making of Buddhist Modernism. Oxford University Press. ISBN 978-0-19-972029-3.
- Melton, J. Gordon (2010). "Relics" (PDF). In Melton, J. Gordon; Baumann, Martin (eds.). Religions of the world (2nd ed.). Santa Barbara, CA: ABC-CLIO. p. 2392. ISBN 978-1-59884-204-3. Archived from the original (PDF) on 2017-03-21.
- Miles, W. F. S. (29 March 2011). "Millenarian Movements as Cultural Resistance: The Karen and Martinican Cases". Comparative Studies of South Asia, Africa and the Middle East. 30 (3): 644–659. doi:10.1215/1089201x-2010-041.
- Murti, T.R.V. (2008) [1955]. The central philosophy of Buddhism: a study of the Mādhyamika system. London: Routledge. ISBN 978-1-135-02946-3. Archived from the original on 2017-11-22.
- Naquin, Susan (1976). Millenarian Rebellion in China: The Eight Trigrams Uprising of 1813. New Haven: Yale University Press. hdl:1811/5983. ISBN 978-0-300-01893-6.
- Nakamura, Hajime. "Knowledge and reality in Buddhism". In Carr & Mahalingam (1997), pp. 391–406.
- Overmyer, Daniel L. (2013). Folk Buddhist Religion: Dissenting Sects in Late Traditional China. Harvard University Press. ISBN 978-0-674-18316-2.
- Park, Sung Bae (1983). Buddhist faith and sudden enlightenment. Albany, N.Y.: State University of New York Press. ISBN 978-0-87395-673-4.
- Phillips, Tim; Aarons, Haydn (June 2005). "Choosing Buddhism in Australia: towards a traditional style of reflexive spiritual engagement". The British Journal of Sociology. 56 (2): 215–32. doi:10.1111/j.1468-4446.2005.00056.x. PMID 15926905.
- Porcu, E. (2008). Pure Land Buddhism in Modern Japanese Culture. Leiden: Brill Publishers. ISBN 9789004164710.
- Powers, John (2013). A Concise Encyclopedia of Buddhism. Oneworld Publications. ISBN 978-1-78074-476-6.
- Rambelli, Fabio. "Local divinities and Buddhism". In Buswell (2004), pp. 465–69.
- Reader, Ian. "Japan". In Landes (2000).
- Reynolds, Frank E.; Hallisey, Charles. "Buddha". In Jones (2005b), pp. 1075–83.
- Robinson, Richard H.; Johnson, Willard L. (1997). The Buddhist religion: a historical introduction (4th ed.). Belmont, Calif.: Cengage. ISBN 978-0-534-20718-2.
- Rotman, Andy (2008). Thus Have I Seen: Visualizing Faith in Early Indian Buddhism. Oxford University Press. ISBN 978-0-19-045117-2.
- Shields, James Mark. "Political Interpretations of the Lotus Sūtra". In Emmanuel (2013).
- Shōto, Hase. "Jōdo Shinshu". In Jones (2005g), pp. 4933–36.
- Smart, Ninian. "The Buddha". In Carr & Mahalingam (1997), pp. 276–85.
- Snellgrove, David L. "Buddhas and Bodhisattvas: Celestial Buddhas and Bodhisattvas". In Jones (2005b), pp. 1059–71.
- Kalama Sutta: The Buddha's Charter of Free Inquiry, translated by Soma, Thera, Kandy: Buddhist Publication Society, 1981, AN 3.65
- Spiro, Melford E. (1982). Buddhism and society: a great tradition and its Burmese vicissitudes (2nd ed.). Berkeley [u.a.]: University of California Press. ISBN 978-0-520-04672-6.
- Stone, Jacqueline, I. (1998). "Chanting the August Title of the 'Lotus Sutra: Daimoku' Practices in Classical and Medieval Japan" (PDF). In Payne, Richard, K. (ed.). Re-Visioning "Kamakura" Buddhism. University of Hawaii Press. pp. 116–66. ISBN 978-0-8248-2078-7. Archived from the original on 2015-01-04.
- Stone, Jacqueline I. (2004a). "Lotus Sūtra (Saddharmapuṇḍarīka-Sūtra)". In Buswell (2004), pp. 471–77.
- Stone, Jacqueline I. (2004b). "Nichiren School". In Buswell (2004), pp. 595–98.
- Suvimalee, Samaneri (2005). "Saddhā". In Malalasekera, Gunapala Piyasena (ed.). Encyclopaedia of Buddhism. Vol. VII. Government of Ceylon. OCLC 781859662.
- Swanson, P.L. (1993). "'Zen Is Not Buddhism': Recent Japanese Critiques of Buddha-Nature". Numen. 40 (2): 115–49. doi:10.1163/156852793x00112.
- Swearer, Donald K. "Folk Religion: Folk Buddhism". In Jones (2005e).
- Swearer, Donald K. (2010). The Buddhist world of Southeast Asia (PDF) (2nd ed.). Albany: State University of New York Press. ISBN 978-1-4384-3251-9. Archived from the original (PDF) on 2018-06-12.
- "Canki Sutta: With Canki". Translated by Thanissaro, Bhikkhu. 1999. MN 95.
- Thomas, Edward J. (1953). The History of Buddhist Thought (PDF). History of Civilization (2nd ed.). London: Routledge and Kegan Paul. OCLC 499999025.
- Trainor, K.M. (1989). "Pasanna/Pasada in the Pali Vamsa Literature" (PDF). Vidyodaya. 3: 185–90. ISSN 1391-1937.
- Trainor, Kevin (1997). Relics, ritual, and representation in Buddhism : rematerializing the Sri Lankan Theravāda tradition (digital ed.). Cambridge [u.a.]: Cambridge University Press. ISBN 978-0-521-58280-3.
- Tremblay, Xavier (2007). "The spread of Buddhism in Serindia" (PDF). In Heirman, Ann; Bumbacher, Stephan Peter (eds.). The Spread of Buddhism (online ed.). Leiden: Brill Publishers. pp. 75–129. ISBN 9789004158306. Archived from the original (PDF) on 2017-12-01.
- Tuladhar-Douglas, William. "Pūjā: Buddhist pūjā". In Jones (2005k).
- Welch, Holmes (1967). The Practice of Chinese Buddhism, 1900–50 (PDF). Harvard University Press.
- Werner, Karel. "Non-orthodox Indian philosophies". In Carr & Mahalingam (1997), pp. 116–17.
- Werner, Karel (2013). "Love and Devotion in Buddhism". In Werner, Karel (ed.). Love Divine: Studies in Bhakti and Devotional Mysticism. Hoboken: Taylor and Francis. ISBN 978-1-136-77461-4.
- Wijayaratna, Mohan (1990). Buddhist monastic life: according to the texts of the Theravāda tradition. Translated by Grangier, Claude; Collins, Steven. Cambridge University Press. ISBN 978-0-521-36428-7.
- Williams, Paul (2008). Mahayana Buddhism: The Doctrinal Foundations (2nd ed.). Taylor & Francis. ISBN 978-0-203-42847-4.
- Wilson, Jeff (2018). "'The New Science of Health and Happiness': Investigating Buddhist Engagements with the Scientific Study Of Meditation". Zygon. 53 (1): 49–66. doi:10.1111/zygo.12391.
