= Francisco Torres Oliver =

Spanish translator

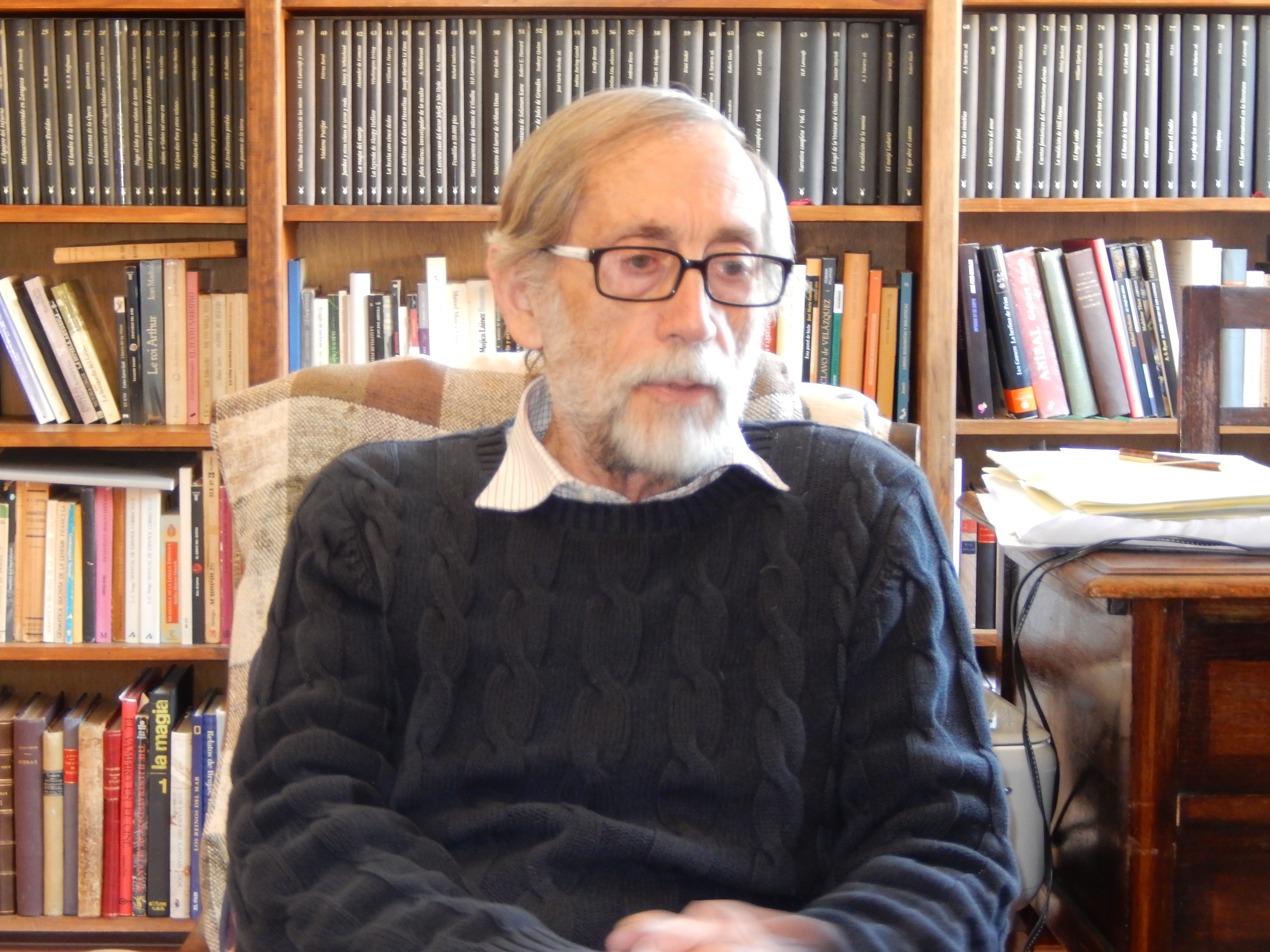
- Born: June 21, 1935 (age 91); Villajoyosa, Alicante, España
- Occupations: Translator, essayist, painter

Francisco Torres Oliver (born Villajoyosa, Alicante (Spain), June 21, 1935) is a Spanish translator. He studied "Filosofía y letras", in the branch of Philosophy, at the Universidad Complutense, Madrid.

He specializes in English fantastic literature. Along with the scholar Rafael Llopis, he is one of the main proponents of macabre and mystery literature in Spain. Regarding the macabre, he has stated that "it is the young people who have greater curiosity". Torres Oliver has also translated numerous texts of history, philosophy, and anthropology into Spanish.

He has translated, among others, the following authors: Charles Dickens, D. H. Lawrence, Daniel Defoe, H. P. Lovecraft, James Hogg, Jane Austen, Lewis Carroll, Thomas Hardy, Thomas Malory, Arthur Machen, M. R. James and Vladimir Nabokov. He has also translated some French works.

In 1991 he received the Premio nacional de traducción de literatura infantil y juvenil, for the book "Los perros de la Morrigan" (The Hounds of the Morrigan) (Editorial Siruela), by the Irish author Pat O'Shea. Later, in 2001, he won the Premio Nacional a la Obra de un Traductor of Spain, in recognition of all his professional work.

Concerning the current state of translation in Spain, Torres Oliver recognizes that the task of the translator has changed in recent years; nevertheless, he believes that translators are "still underpaid."

Torres Oliver is also a painter.

== Selected bibliography ==
- Histoire des religions, translated as Las religiones en la India y en el Extremo Oriente: formación de las religiones universales y de salvación, by André Bareau [et al.] (Editorial Siglo XXI)
- Never on a Broomstick, as Historia de la brujería, by Frank R. Donovan (Alianza Ed., 1978)
- The Death of Arthur, as La muerte de Arturo, by Thomas Malory (Ed. Siruela, 1985)
- Watership Down as La colina de Watership, by Richard Adams (Ultramar, 1986)
- (Ghost stories), as Relatos de fantasmas, by Edith Wharton (Alianza, 1987)
- (Ghost stories), as La tía de Seaton y otros relatos, by Walter de la Mare (Alfaguara, 1987)
- The Hill of Dreams, as La colina de los sueños, by Arthur Machen (Siruela, 1988)
- (Ghost stories), as La casa vacía, by Algernon Blackwood (Siruela, 1989)
- A Vision, as Una visión, by W. B. Yeats (Siruela, 1991)
- The Food of the Gods, as El alimento de los dioses, by Arthur C. Clarke (C.E.C.I., 1991)
- A Christmas Carol, as Canción de Navidad, by Charles Dickens (Vicens-Vives, 1994)
- The Monk, as El monje, by Matthew Gregory Lewis (Valdemar, 1994)
- Winter's Tales, as Cuentos de invierno, by Isak Dinesen (RBA, 1994)
- Melmoth the Wanderer, as Melmoth el errabundo, by Charles Robert Maturin (Valdemar, 1996)
- Jude the Obscure, as Jude el oscuro, by Thomas Hardy (Alba, 1996)
- Mansfield Park, by Jane Austen (Alba, 1996)
- Of Mice and Men, as De ratones y hombres, by John Steinbeck (Vicens-Vives, 1996)
- Drácula, by Bram Stoker (Ediciones B, 1997)
- (Complete stories), as Corazones perdidos: cuentos completos de fantasmas, by M. R. James (Valdemar, 1997)
- The house on the Borderland, as La casa en el confín de la tierra, by William Hope Hodgson (Valdemar, 1998)
- Frankenstein, or The Modern Prometheus, as Frankenstein o El moderno Prometeo, by Mary Shelley (Alianza, 1998)
- Fantastic fables, as Fábulas fantásticas, by Ambrose Bierce (Valdemar, 1999)
- A General History of the Pyrates, as Historia general de los robos y asesinatos de los más famosos piratas, by Daniel Defoe (Valdemar, 1999)
- Lady Chatterley's Lover, as El amante de lady Chatterley, by D. H. Lawrence (Alianza, 2001)
- Curso de literatura europea, by Vladimir Nabokov (C. de Lectores, 2001)
- The Case of Charles Dexter Ward, as El caso de Charles Dexter Ward, by H. P. Lovecraft (Valdemar, 2002)
- Gulliver's travels, as Los viajes de Gulliver, by Jonathan Swift (Valdemar, 2003)
- Through the Looking-Glass, as Alicia en el País de las Maravillas: a través del espejo, by Lewis Carroll (Akal, 2003)
- Treasure Island, as La isla del tesoro, by Robert L. Stevenson (Valdemar, 2004)
- (Cthulhu Mithos), as Los mitos de Cthulhu, by H. P. Lovecraft (et al.) (with Rafael Llopis, Alianza, 2005)
- Anecdotes of Painting in England, as El arte de los jardines modernos, by Horace Walpole (Siruela, 2005)
- (Complete narrative), as Narrativa completa, I, by H. P. Lovecraft (et al., Valdemar, 2005)
- The Narrative of Arthur Gordon Pym of Nantucket, as El relato de Arthur Gordon Pym, by Edgar Allan Poe (Valdemar, 2006)
- (Complete narrative), as Narrativa completa, II, by H. P. Lovecraft (with Juan A. Molina Foix, Valdemar, 2007)
