= Premio Nacional a la Obra de un Traductor =

Spanish national prize for literary translation

National Prize for the Work of a Translator
- Native name: Premio Nacional a la Obra de un Traductor
- Country: Spain
- Presented by: Ministry of Culture and Sport (Spain)
- Eligibility: Spanish literary translator who has dedicated special attention to translating works into any of the official Spanish languages.
- Website: www.cultura.gob.es

The National Prize for the Work of a Translator (Spanish: Premio Nacional a la Obra de un Traductor) is a translation national award conferred by the Ministry of Culture and Sport. The award is granted to recognize the body of work of a Spanish literary translator, who has dedicated special attention to translating literary works into any of the official Spanish languages. It was established in 1989 and is currently endowed with a cash prize of €30,000.

== Criteria and distinction ==
This prize is awarded for the translator's entire career and body of work, which distinguishes it from the related National Prize for the Best Translation (Premio Nacional a la Mejor Traducción), which recognizes a single translated work [1].

The jury's rationale often highlights not only the literary quality and the complexity of the works translated but also the winner's broader contributions to the field. For instance, winners are often recognized for their role as trainers and mentors of translators and their activism in favor of literary translation and the promotion of reading, especially among younger audiences.

== Winners ==
- 2025 - Xabier Olarra Lizaso
- 2024 - Mercedes Corral (Mercedes Corral Corral)
- 2023 - Celia Filipetto
- 2022 - Juan Gabriel López Guix
- 2021 - Anne-Hélène Suárez (Anne-Hélène Suárez Girard)
- 2020 - Xavier Senín Fernández (Xavier Senín)
- 2019 - Dolors Udina (María Dolors Udina Abelló)
- 2018 – Carmen Gauger
- 2017 – Malika Embarek
- 2016 – Ramón Buenaventura
- 2015 – Jordi Fibla
- 2014 – Mariano Antolín Rato
- 2013 – Josu Zabaleta
- 2012 – Francisco J. Uriz
- 2011 – Selma Ancira
- 2010 – Adan Kovacsis
- 2009 – Roser Berdagué Costa
- 2008 – María Teresa Gallego Urrutia
- 2007 – José Luis Reina Palazón
- 2006 – Agustín García Calvo
- 2005 – Francisco Rodríguez Adrados
- 2004 – Juan José del Solar
- 2003 – Eustaquio Barjau
- 2002 – Carlos García Gual
- 2001 – Francisco Torres Oliver
- 2000 – José Luis López Muñoz
- 1999 – Luis Gil Fernández
- 1998 – Valentín García Yebra
- 1997 – Clara Janés
- 1996 – Salustiano Masó
- 1995 – Andrés Sánchez Pascual
- 1994 – Feliu Formosa
- 1993 – Ángel Crespo
- 1992 – Esther Benítez Eiroa
- 1991 – Miguel Sáenz
- 1990 – José María Valverde
- 1989 – Juan Ramón Masoliver

== See also ==
- National Prize for Literature (Spain)
