= Miguel Sáenz =

Spanish translator (born 1932)

The Most Excellent Miguel Sáenz
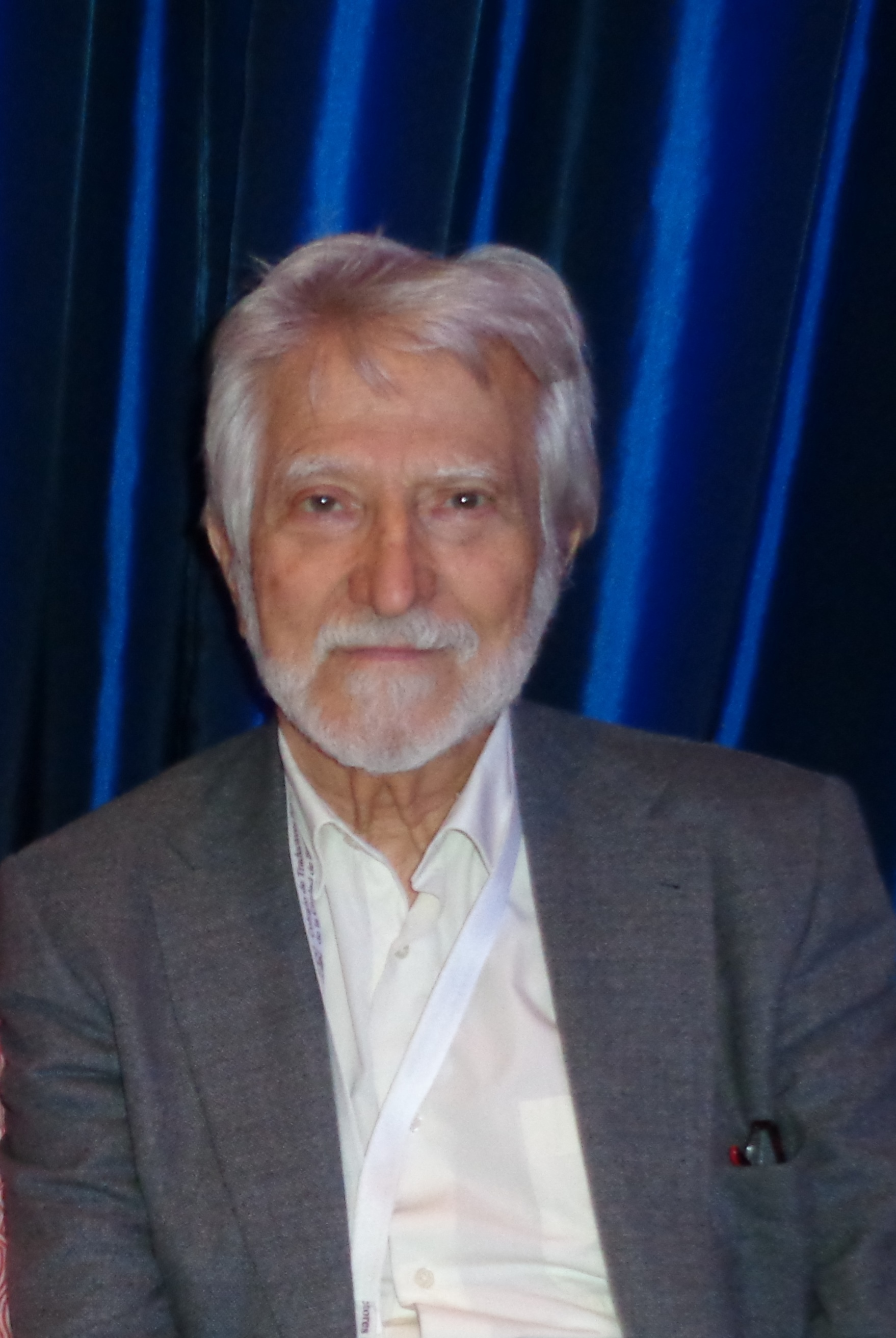
- Sáenz in 2016
- Born: Miguel Sáenz Sagaseta de Ilúrdoz; August 7, 1932 (age 94); Larache, Spanish Morocco
- Education: Universidad Complutense de Madrid
- Occupations: Linguist and translator
- Organization: German Academy for Language and Literature

Seat b of the Real Academia Española
- Incumbent
- Assumed office 23 June 2013 (Note: Elected on 22 November 2012)
- Preceded by: Eliseo Álvarez-Arenas Pacheco

Miguel Sáenz Sagaseta de Ilúrdoz (Larache, Spanish Morocco, 1932) is a Spanish translator.

== Biography ==
Born in colonial Morocco, he was son of a military officer. He studied German philology at the Complutense University of Madrid.

He specialized in translating German authors into Spanish: Bertolt Brecht, Günter Grass, W. G. Sebald, Thomas Bernhard (of whom he also wrote a biography). He has also translated from English: William Faulkner, Henry Roth, Salman Rushdie.

Since 1999 he is a member of the German Academy for Language and Poetry. In 2002 he was the first Spanish translator to receive an honoris causa diploma from the University of Salamanca. Sáenz was elected to seat b of the Real Academia Española on 22 November 2012, he took up his seat on 23 June 2013.

== Awards ==
- In 1991 he was awarded the Premio Nacional a la Obra de un Traductor.
- On 18 February 2019 he received the Medalla de Oro al Mérito en las Bellas Artes.
