= Rafael Llopis =

Spanish psychiatrist, essayist, and translator (1933–2022)

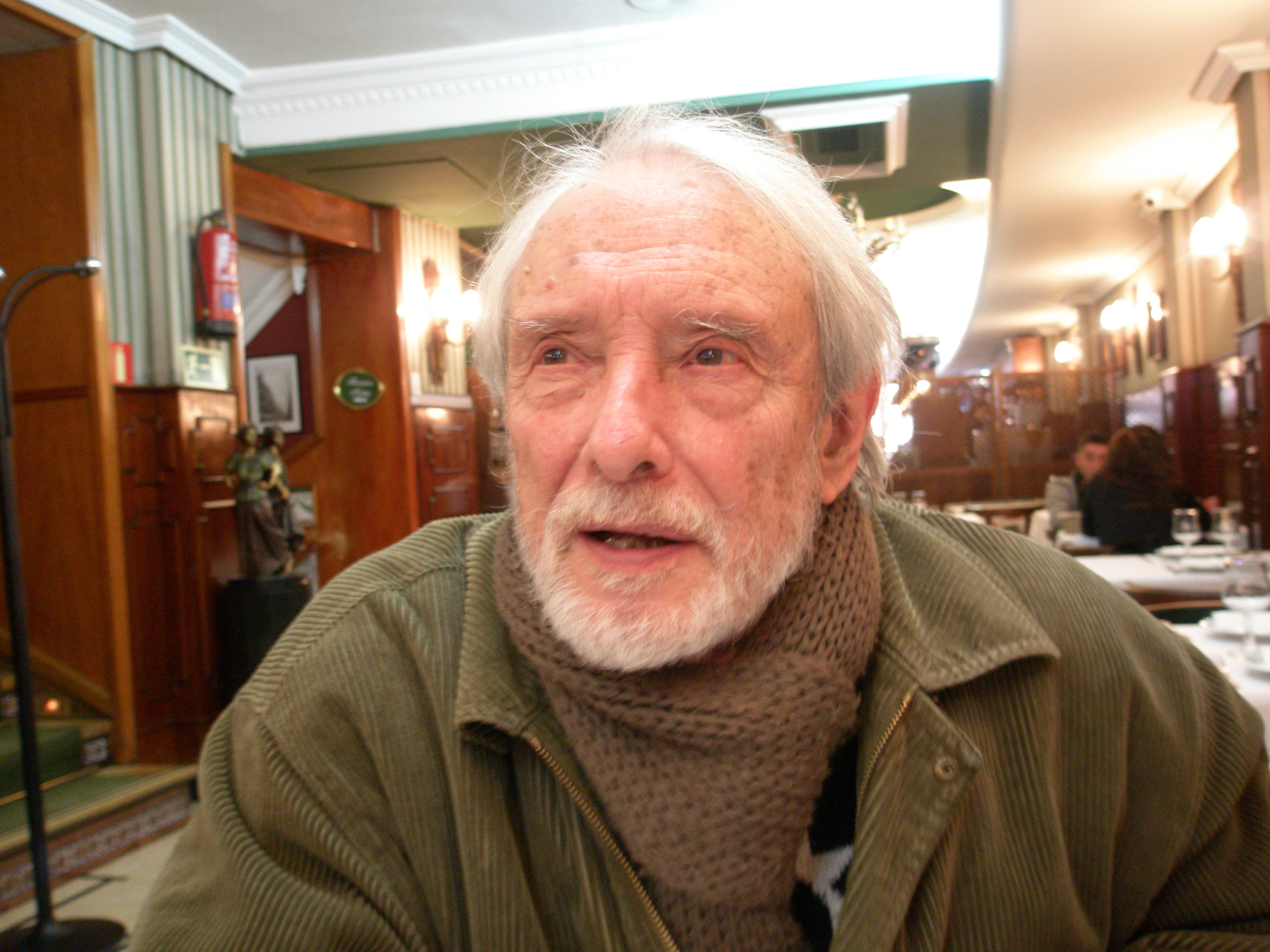
- Born: 17 April 1933; Madrid, Spain
- Died: 24 March 2022 (aged 88); Pozuelo de Alarcón, Spain
- Occupations: Essayist, translator, psychiatrist
- Writing career
- Genres: Horror, fantastic
- Notable works: Historia natural de los cuentos de miedo, Los mitos de Cthulhu, ed., El novísimo Algazife o Libro de las Postrimerías

Rafael Llopis Paret (17 April 1933 – 24 March 2022), was a Spanish psychiatrist, essayist and translator, who specialized in fantasy and horror fiction.

== Biography ==
He studied medicine at the Universidad Complutense of Madrid. As a psychiatrist, he worked in various health centers in the Comunidad de Madrid until his retirement, in 1998.

After his high school years he was interested in fantasy, that in the absence of publications in Castilian he read in French. With the English he had learnt in high school and a dictionary he began to read Sheridan Le Fanu, one of his favourite authors, and other writers of fantastic literature not available in French. He was considered, along with translator Francisco Torres Oliver, one of the best introducers of the genre of mystery and macabre in Spanish.

Llopis was an authority in H. P. Lovecraft, an author barely known in Spain until his publication of the famous anthology Los mitos de Cthulhu (1969) (see Cthulhu Mythos), collecting for the first time many stories by authors of the so called Lovecraft Circle, as Robert E. Howard, Frank Belknap Long, Clark Ashton Smith, etc., as well as his direct literary heirs: Robert Bloch, Ramsey Campbell and August Derleth, among others.

Llopis was also responsible for Cuentos de terror (Editorial Taurus, 1963), the extensive study Esbozo de una historia natural de los cuentos de miedo (Editorial Júcar, 1974) and the three-volume edition of the Antología de cuentos de terror (Alianza Editorial, 1981).

He was also the author of the collection El novísimo Algazife o Libro de las Postrimerías, "unclassifiable book that proposes a new reading of the myth of Cthulhu and of the Egyptians, who matches between vampires, aliens and haunted Moors, in a dance macabre as those of the last millennium" (from back cover).

In the 1985 Siruela book Literatura fantástica, he published one of his essays: El cuento de terror y el instinto de la muerte, along with other texts of Jorge Luis Borges, Italo Calvino, Carlos García Gual, etc. In this essay, Llopis defined the weird tale as that genre «whose primary purpose is to produce, such as Walter Scott said, "a nice shiver of supernatural terror". I refer to a type of story whose raw material is not so much death itself as what it has or may have after death: the supernatural, the living from the beyond».

In 2013 he published a corrected reprint of his Historia natural de los cuentos de miedo [Natural History of Weird Tales]. Critic and writer José Luis Fernández Arellano collaborated with him in this work updating its contents.

== Bibliography ==
- (several authors): Cuentos de terror (editor) Ed. Taurus – Madrid, 1963.
- (several authors): Los mitos de Cthulhu (editor and partly translator) Ed. Alianza – Madrid, 1969. ISBN 84-206-1194-8 (Ed. de 1976)
- LOVECRAFT, H. P.: Viajes al otro mundo. Ciclo de aventuras oníricas de Randolph Carter (preface). Ed. Alianza – Madrid, 1971. ISBN 84-206-1306-1
- JAMES, M. R.: Trece historias de fantasmas (preface). Ed. Alianza – Madrid, 1973. ISBN 84-206-1486-6
- LLOPIS, Rafael: Esbozo de una historia natural de los cuentos de miedo. Ed. Júcar – Madrid, 1974. ISBN 84-334-0172-6
- LLOPIS, Rafael: El novísimo Algazife o Libro de las Postrimerías. Ed. Hiperión – Madrid, 1980. ISBN 84-7517-015-3
- LOVECRAFT, H. P.: Los que vigilan desde el tiempo (translator). Ed. Alianza – Madrid, 1981. ISBN 84-206-1807-1
- (several authors): Antología de cuentos de terror, 3 vol. (editor and partly translator) Ed. Alianza – Madrid, 1981. ISBN 84-206-1958-2

Volume 1: De Daniel Defoe a Edgar Allan Poe
Volume 2: De Charles Dickens a M. R. James
Volume 3: De Arthur Machen a H. P. Lovecraft

- LLOPIS, Rafael: El cuento de terror y el instinto de la muerte (into the book "Literatura Fantástica", several authors) Ed. Siruela – Madrid, 1985. ISBN 84-85876-32-6
- MACHEN, Arthur: Un fragmento de vida (translator). Ed. Siruela – Madrid, 1987. ISBN 84-7844-906-X
- LLOPIS, Rafael: Historia natural de los cuentos de miedo (with José L. Fernández Arellano). Ediciones Fuentetaja - Madrid, 2013. ISBN 978-84-95079-38-1
