= Mohan Wijayaratna =

Sri Lankan anthropologist (born 1947)

Môhan Wijayaratna
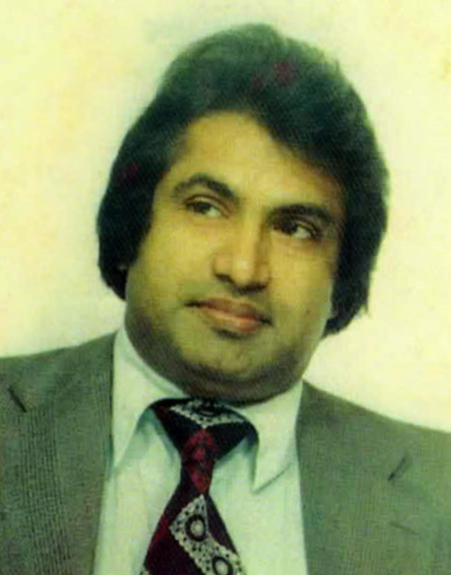
- Born: 1947 (age 78–79)
- Occupations: Anthropologist; Tanslator from Pali, Sanskrit
- Years active: Since 1980
- Known for: Translation of the texts from the Pali Canon into French

Academic background
- Education: • Paris 1 Panthéon-Sorbonne University • Collège de France, Paris
- Thesis: • Le renoncement au monde dans le monachisme bouddhique theravada et dans le monachisme chrétien du désert (IVe siècle) (1980). • Le culte des dieux chez les bouddhistes singhalais : la religion populaire de Ceylan face au bouddhisme Theravada (1986)
- Doctoral advisor: Guy Bugault, André Bareau

Academic work
- Discipline: Theravada Buddhism
- Main interests: Pali, Sanskrit, Buddhism
- Notable works: Full translation of the Majjhima Nikaya and Digha Nikaya

Môhan Wijayaratna is a Sinhalese anthropologist born in Sri Lanka in 1947 specializing in Buddhism Theravada branch. An expert in Pali and Sanskrit, he has translated numerous texts into French, including the entire Majjhima Nikaya and Digha Nikaya. His work also focuses on contemporary society at the time of the Buddha, from the perspective of cultural anthropology.

== Biography ==
Môhan Wijayaratna was born in 1947 in Sri Lanka, country where Buddhism is the state religion. (Note: Text in French: “ Môhan Wijayaratna, Singhalais, né et élevé en milieu bouddhiste… ”) He studied at the Collège de France, where he worked on Buddhist literature and philosophy. From the 1980s onward, he produced French translations of several Pāli texts, aiming to make early Buddhist teachings more accessible to a wider readership. His works include translations of the Vinaya Piṭaka and studies of the daily life of monks in early Buddhism. His books have been reviewed in French academic and religious journals, where scholars have noted his contribution to bringing Theravāda perspectives into European scholarship.

He also translated ninety-one other discourses from the Udāna, Itivuttaka, Saṃyutta Nikāya, and Aṅguttara Nikāya. These were arranged thematically and presented as explorations of the principal aspects of Buddhism as classified in the three baskets of the Pali Canon:

1. Discipline Basket (Vinaya Piṭaka)
2. Discourses of the Buddha (Sutta Piṭaka)
3. Doctrinal analysis (Abhidhamma Piṭaka)

In total, Wijayaratna produced French translations of 277 canonical texts. He chose to reproduce the texts in full, retaining the traditional repetitions that originally served as mnemonic aids in oral transmission. His translations are often described as clear and faithful to the original Pali.

== Works ==
=== In French ===
- Le Moine bouddhiste. La vie monastique selon les textes du Théravāda. Préface de André Bareau, Éditions du Cerf, Paris, 1983, 288 p. (Rééd. Éditions Lis, Paris, 2016); ISBN 2912117127.
- Le Culte des dieux chez les bouddhistes singhalais. Éditions du Cerf, Paris, 1987, 674 p.; ISBN 2204027952.
- Le Bouddha et ses disciples (traduction de 27 textes du Canon bouddhique). Éditions du Cerf, Paris, 1990, 262 p.; ISBN 2204041580.
- Les Moniales bouddhistes. Éditions du Cerf, Paris, 1991, 219 p. (Rééd. Éditions Lis, Paris, 2016); ISBN 2204043966.
- Au-delà de la mort : une explication sur les renaissances et les karmas selon le bouddhisme originel (traduction de 10 textes du Canon bouddhique). Éditions Lis, Paris, 1996, 206 p.; ISBN 2912117003.
- Le dernier voyage du Bouddha. Traduction intégrale du Mahāparinibbāna Sutta. Éditions Lis, Paris, 1998, 242 p.; ISBN 9782912117014.
- La Philosophie du Bouddha (traduction de 10 textes du Canon bouddhique). Éditions Lis, Paris, 2000, 330 p.; ISBN 291211702X.
- Les Entretiens du Bouddha (traduction de 21 textes du Canon bouddhique). Éditions du Seuil, coll. « Points Sagesses » n° Sa162, Paris, 2001, 266 p.; ISBN 9782020475532.
- Le renoncement au monde dans le bouddhisme et le christianisme. Éditions Lis, Paris, 2002, 307 p.; ISBN 9782912117038.
- Sermons du Bouddha (traduction de 20 textes du Canon bouddhique). Éditions du Seuil, coll. « Points Sagesses » n° Sa211, Paris, 2006, 250 p.; ISBN 9782757859933. (1re éd. : Éditions du Cerf, Paris, 1988, avec 25 suttas).
- Dīgha Nikāya. Éditions Lis, Paris, 2007–2008 (rééd. 2017–2019), 1 074 p. :
  - Vol. 1, 316 p.; ISBN 9782912117045
  - Vol. 2, 373 p.; ISBN 9782912117052
  - Vol. 3, 385 p.; ISBN 9782912117069
- Majjhima Nikāya. Éditions Lis, Paris, 2009–2011, 2 034 p. :
  - Vol. 1, 396 p.; ISBN 9782912117076
  - Vol. 2, 407 p.; ISBN 9782912117083
  - Vol. 3, 424 p.; ISBN 9782912117090
  - Vol. 4, 412 p. (postface de Gérard Fussman); ISBN 9782912117106
  - Vol. 5, 395 p. (présentation de Michel Hulin); ISBN 9782912117113

=== Collective volume ===
- Le fait religieux. Ouvrage collectif dirigé par Jean Delumeau. Contribution : « Le bouddhisme dans les pays du Théravāda ». Fayard, Paris, 2014, 782 p.; ISBN 9782213675237.

=== In English ===
- Buddhist Monastic Life: According to the Texts of the Theravāda Tradition. Cambridge University Press, Cambridge, 1990, 214 p.; ISBN 9780521364287.
- Buddhist Nuns: The Birth and Development of a Women's Monastic Order. Wisdom Publishers, Colombo, 2001, 222 p. (Rééd. Buddhist Publication Society, Kandy, 2010); ISBN 9559728806.

=== Articles ===
- « Funerary rites in Japanese and other Asian Buddhist societies », 1997.

=== In Korean ===
- 비구니 승가 (Biguni Seung-ga). Korean translation of Les moniales bouddhistes. Trans. On Yon-ch’ol and Sok Chi-gwan. Minjoksa Publishing Co., Seoul, 1998, 261 p.; ISBN 8970093443.

=== In Spanish ===
- El Monje Budista Según los textos del Theravada. Trans. Antonio Rodríguez. Pre-Textos Índika, Valencia, 2010, 258 p.; ISBN 9788492913510.

== Bibliography ==
- Steven Collins; Claude Grangier (1990). Buddhist Monastic Life: According to the Texts of the Theravāda Tradition. Cambridge University Press. p. 216. ISBN 978-0521367080.
