= Faith in the Baháʼí Faith =

Faith for Baháʼís is the belief in a single, supreme, and unknowable God and especially the belief that both Bahá'u'lláh and the Báb, religious figures from 19th-century Iran, are the two most recent divinely-inspired messengers sent by God to teach humanity how to live a correct and spiritually fulfilling life. Baháʼís pray, observe religious holidays, perform ritual practices such as fasting, and may attend religious gatherings with other Baháʼís, though there are no Baháʼí clergy or traditional sermons.

Baháʼís believe in life after death, where one is better off for having lived a life of faith and virtue. However, Baháʼís have a different view on these ideas than most practitioners of related faiths like Christianity or Islam. For instance, Baháʼís view heaven and hell as allegorical rather than as physical places. Baháʼí beliefs hold that all souls are eternal and continue on their journey towards God after death. There is no binary notion of souls that will be saved versus souls that will be punished.

Salvation for Baháʼís is not contingent on faith in this life per se but on the development and display of virtues such as love, compassion, and trustworthiness as described in the Baháʼí scriptures. Faith in a Baháʼí context is therefore the belief that Bahá'u'lláh is a Manifestation of God, that his message is true, and that living according to his teachings is best way for both the individual and humanity to become closer to God in this life and the next.

== General Beliefs ==
The Baháʼí faith is an Abrahamic religion whose adherents believe that God continually and periodically sends divinely-inspired messengers known as Manifestations of God. The Baháʼí covenant includes the belief that Bahá'u'lláh and the Báb are the most recent Manifestations of God, continuing a line of religious teachers that includes Jesus, Muhammad, and the Buddha, among others, in a process termed progressive revelation. Despite the apparent differences in the religions taught by these figures, Baháʼís believe in the oneness of religion, the idea that the core teachings of all major world religions are fundamentally in unity and come from the same divine source.

A secondary but still essential aspect of the Covenant of Bahá'u'lláh is acceptance of the line of succession. Before his death, Bahá'u'lláh appointed his son Abdu'l-Bahá as head of the faith, and Abdu'l-Bahá did the same to his grandson, Shoghi Effendi, who established the Universal House of Justice which governs the faith today. The writings and recorded words of Abdu'l-Bahá and Shoghi Effendi are seen as authoritative and part of Bahá'i scripture.

Though the Universal House of Justice is also authoritative and can overturn its own rulings, it may not abrogate the rulings of these former heads of the faith or any part of scripture. As such, a core aspect of the faith is the acceptance of the authority of Effendi and Abdu'l-Bahá. For a confessed Baháʼí to persistently deny or subvert the legitimacy of this line of succession is grounds for being labeled a covenant-breaker. There exist very small groups, such as the Orthodox Baháʼí's, who recognize additional guardians in place of the Universal House of Justice, and accordingly are seen as covenant-breakers by the vast majority of Baháʼís.

Baháʼís believe faith and science are and must be compatible.

== Practice of Faith ==
Practicing Baháʼís seek to develop virtuous or spiritual qualities such as love, compassion, trustworthiness, patience, wisdom, and general selflessness as outlined in the teachings of the faith, believing these will bring them and humanity closer to God. The prescribed daily prayers and yearly fasts are seen as tools for personal spiritual development. The Baháʼí Faith places importance on the independent investigation of truth, where one studies scripture and other questions of reality personally rather than having them explained primarily by religious leaders.

Baháʼís are forbidden from practicing monasticism and are encouraged to be active in the world and their community. Performing and doing well at one's work, so long as it benefits humanity, is considered a form of worship for Baháʼís.

== See also ==
- Ethics in religion
- Baháʼí teachings#Independent investigation of truth
