= Juan Ramón Masoliver =

Juan Ramon Masoliver (1910–1997) was a Spanish art critic, essayist and translator. He was a pioneer of the Surrealist movement in Catalonia, helping to found the Surrealist magazine Helix in 1929, with Salvador Dalí and Luis Bunuel. Living in Paris in the 1930s, he was a friend of James Joyce and a secretary to Ezra Pound.

After the Spanish Civil War, he returned to Spain and worked briefly for General Franco. He wrote for more than 60 years in the pages of La Vanguardia. His books include Presentation of James Joyce (1981) and Profile of Clouds (1991). He was also an award-winning translator of Italian literature; among his translations are works by such as Guido Cavalcanti, Carlo Emilio Gadda and Italo Calvino.

He has been considered the inspiration and driving force behind the Critics' Awards. He also participated in the creation of the UNESCO International Association of Literary Critics, a section of the international organization, and its Spanish division, of which he eventually served as honorary president. His work as a translator of Italian authors such as Guido Cavalcanti and Carlo Emilio Gadda earned him recognition in the first edition of the National Prize for the Work of a Translator, in 1989.
