= André Bareau =

French Buddhologist (1921–1993)

- Born: 31 December 1921; Saint-Mandé, France
- Died: 2 March 1993 (aged 71); 14th arrondissement of Paris, France
- Occupations: Buddhologist; Professor at the Collège de France
- Years active: 1971–1991
- Known for: Works on the biography of The Buddha
- Notable work: • En Suivant Bouddha • Recherches sur la Biographie du Bouddha (3 vol.)
- Awards: Ordre des Palmes académiques, Officer, (1972).

André Bareau (31 December 1921 – 2 March 1993) was a prominent French Buddhologist and a leader in the establishment of the field of Buddhist Studies in the 20th century. He was a professor at the Collège de France from 1971 to 1991 and Director of the Study of Buddhist Philosophy at L'École Pratique des Hautes Études.

Between 1955 and 1985, he carried out eight missions in Asia, in countries where Buddhism had been practiced for 2,500 years.

He wrote numerous books, 307 articles and reviews between 1951 and 1994, some of which were published posthumously.

== Biography ==
André Bareau was born on 31 December 1921 in Saint-Mandé into a modest family. At the age of seventeen, in 1938, he was admitted to the École normale d'instituteurs de Paris (Teacher Training College). In 1941, he began his career as a teacher in La Varenne-Saint-Hilaire (a district of Saint-Mandé). That same year, he began Postgraduate education at the Sorbonne University, which he completed in 1946

Then, while preparing a degree in philosophy at this institution, he discovered languages Sanskrit and Pāli. In 1947, he defended a mémoire under the supervision of Jean Filliozat, on the Pali Buddhist notion of "asaṅkhata" ("the unformed, the unconditioned "), and joined the French National Centre for Scientific Research (CNRS). He went on to study Chinese and Tibetan, and in 1951 defended his thesis entitled « L'Absolu en philosophie bouddhique. Évolution de la notion d'asaṃskṛta (The Absolute in Buddhist philosophy. Evolution of the notion of Asaṃskṛta). Doctor of Letters (Docteur ès lettres), he was professor at the Collège de France from 1971 to 1991 and director of studies in Buddhist philology at the École pratique des hautes études.

A few years before his death, he fell seriously ill. Deprived of speech, he never complained and continued his work as long as he could. He died on 2 March 1993.

At the end of a life dedicated to the study of Buddhism, his funeral was celebrated according to the rite of the Protestant church, under the aegis of a verse from the Gospel of Luke :

"Glory to God in the highest, and on earth peace, good will toward men"

In his posthumous tribute to Alain Bareau, his friend and colleague Gérard Fussman, professor at the Collège de France wrote on 15 January 1994:

His great qualities quickly won him academic recognition. [...] His writings include many popular texts : like most Orientalists, he felt it was his duty to give the public as accurate a picture as possible of the field he was studying;[...] he also knew that a text, however ancient, cannot be interpreted solely by the methods of philology. He had interviewed many Sinhalese monks visiting Paris, the venerable Walpola Rahula Thero in particular; he had visited Buddhist communities in Ceylon and Indochina, visited ancient sites and travelled the roads of India, sometimes in difficult conditions. Having travelled with him, I know that he was a man of the land, a tireless walker looking at his maps, scanning the landscape and capable, if need be, of sleeping on the ground on a half-empty stomach without thinking of complaining. […]Modest to excess. Mr Bareau shunned titles, honours and so-called positions of power: it was out of a sense of duty that he agreed to be a member of the CNRS National Committee for a time.

== Works ==
André Bareau's work was aimed at understanding the essential notions of Buddhism, for in his view, multiple interpretations, too often far removed from one another, had led to great divisions within the Buddhist community.

His works, which focused mainly on the biography of the Buddha, has become an essential reference. His research was not limited to texts alone. He was also interested in the archaeological aspect, paying particular attention to the stupas and also to the epigraphics texts. Between 1955 and 1985, he made eight trips, as part of the missions organised by the Collège de France, to the various countries where Buddhism has been practised for 2,500 years: India, Ceylon, Cambodia, Thailand

His research led him to the conclusion that the birthplace of the Buddha was not Lumbini, as is generally accepted, but Kapilavastu

== Books and articles ==
André Bareau wrote numerous books, 307 articles and reviews between 1951 and 1994 (2 of which were published posthumously). It is impossible to mention them all in the context of this article, but the full list can be consulted online.

Here are just a few of them (all texts are in French).

=== Books ===
- L'absolu en philosophie bouddhique : évolution de la notion d'Asmskrta, Paris, Centre de documentation Universitaire, 1951, 307p.
- Les premiers conciles bouddhiques, Paris, Annales du Musée Guimet, 1955, XII, 188 p. ISBN 9782705936372, read online : .
- Les Sectes bouddhiques du petit véhicule et leurs Abhidharmapiṭaka, PEFEO, 1955, 297p.PDF.
- Bouddha. Présentation, choix de textes, bibliographie, Seghers, coll. "Philosophes de tous les temps", 1962, 222 p.
- Recherches sur la biographie du Buddha dans les Sutrapitaka et les Vinayapitaka anciensl :
  - volume I : De la quête de l'Éveil à la conversion de Sâriputra et Maudgalyâyana, EFEO Publications (PEFEO), vol. 53, Paris, 1963, 405 p.
  - volume II, tome 1 : Les derniers mois, le parinirvâna et les funérailles (continued), PEFEO, vol. 77, 1970, 319 p.
  - volume II, tome 2 : Les derniers mois, le parinirvâna et les funérailles 1971, 342 p. .
  - vol. III : Articles complémentaires, PEFEO, 1995, X-540 p. Articles 1962-1963. ISBN 2-85539-778-2
- En suivant Bouddha. Textes choisis et présentés, Éditions Philippe Lebaud, 1985, 307 p. ISBN 2 866453646, republished in 2000 by Éditions du Félin, 301 p., ISBN 978-2-866-45364-0.
- Les religions de l'Inde, with Walter Schubring, Christoph von Fürer-Halmendorff, (original edition in German, translation by L.Jospin), Lausanne, Payot Éditions:
  - volume 3 : Bouddhisme, jaïnisme, religions archaïques, 1966, 334 p.

=== Articles ===
- La date du Nirvana, Journal Asiatique, vol. 241, p. 27-52, Librairie Orientaliste Paul Geuthner, 1953, 150 p
- Les sectes bouddhiques du Petit Véhicule et leur Abhidharmapitaka, tome 44 n°1, p. 1-11, PEFEO, 1951
- La composition et les étapes de formation du Mahâparinirvânasûtra ancien , Bulletin de l'École Française d'Extrême-Orient, vol. LXVI, p. 45-103, 1979
- Les origines de la pensée bouddhique, Institut bouddhique Truc lâm, 1987
- Lumbinī et la naissance du futur Buddha, Bulletin de l'Ecole française d'Extrême-Orient, tome 76, p. 69-81., 1987

== Awards ==
Ordre des Palmes académiques, Officer, as Professor at the Collège de France in Paris, awarded on 8 August 1972

== Bibliography ==
- Bizot, François (1994), Bulletin de l'École française d'Extrême-Orient 81 (1), 6-9
- Isabelle Szelagowski, Bibliographie des ouvrages d'André Bareau, Bulletin de l'Ecole française d'Extrême-Orient, tome 81, p. 11-34, 1994
